= Early Netherlandish painting =

15th- and 16th-century art of the Low Countries

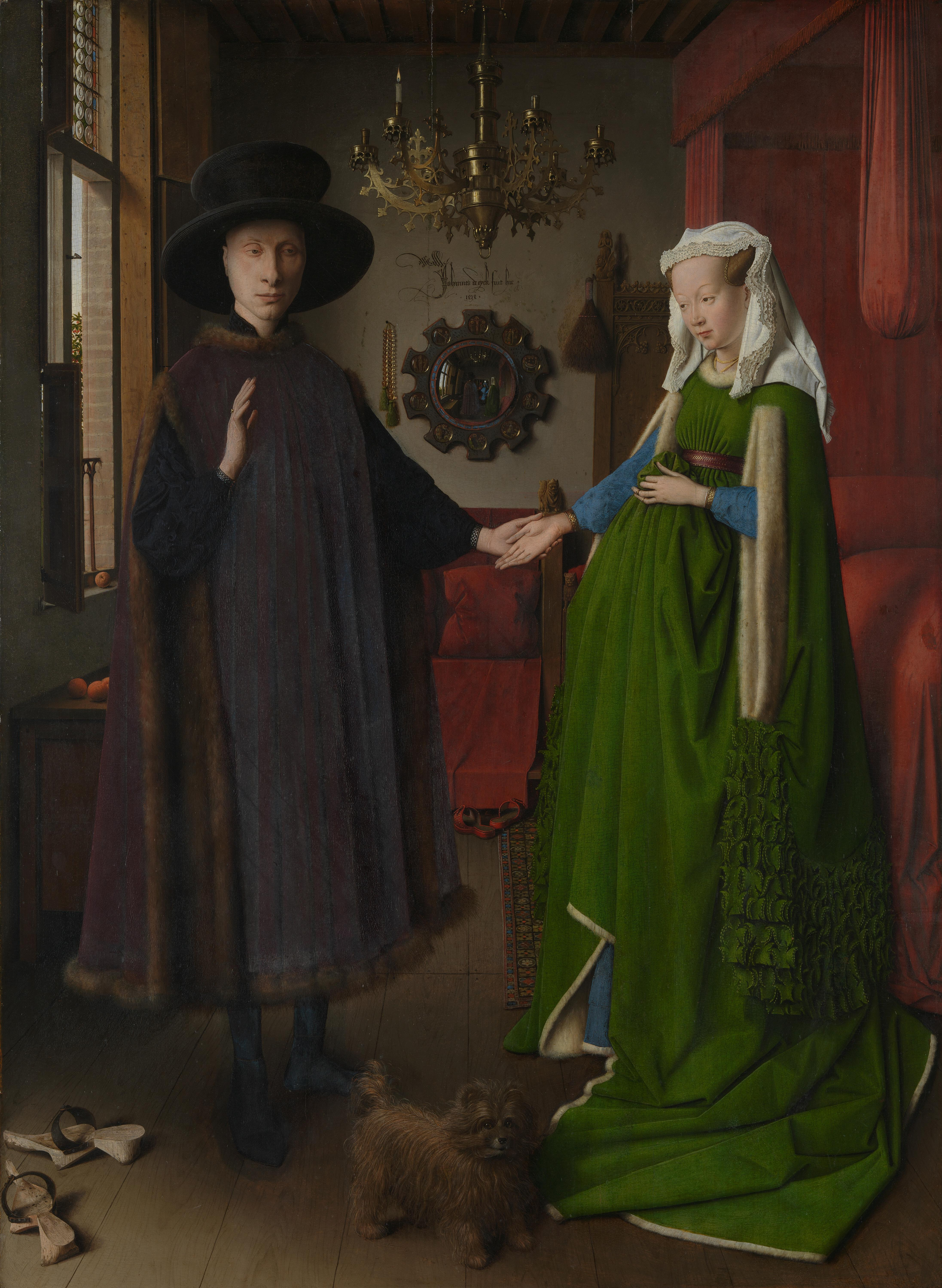
Jan van Eyck, The Arnolfini Portrait, 1434, National Gallery, London

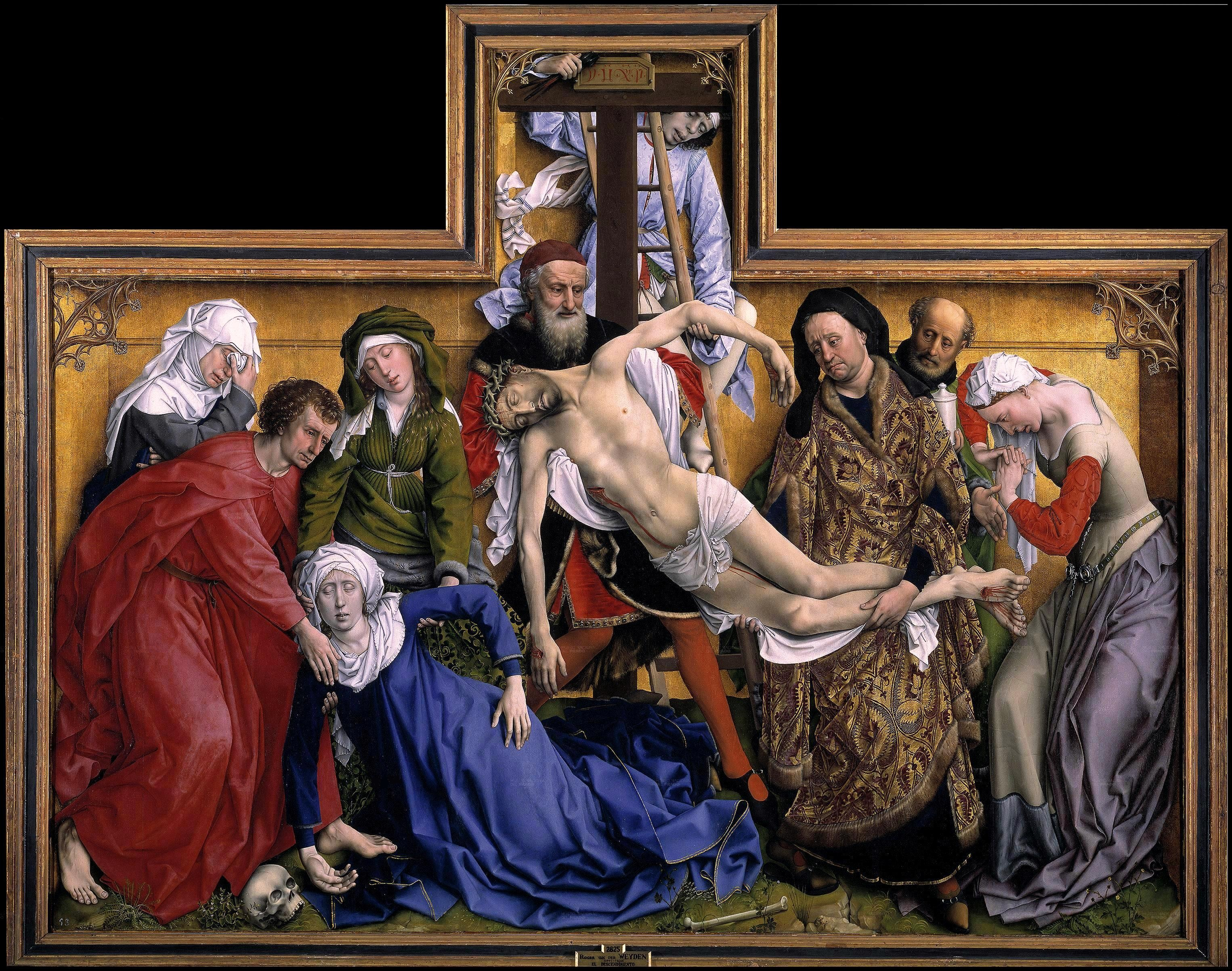
Rogier van der Weyden, The Descent from the Cross, c. 1435, Museo del Prado, Madrid

Early Netherlandish painting is the body of work by artists active in the Burgundian and Habsburg Netherlands during the 15th- and 16th-century Northern Renaissance period, once known as the Flemish Primitives. It flourished especially in the cities of Bruges, Ghent, Mechelen, Leuven, Tournai and Brussels, all in present-day Belgium. The period begins approximately with Robert Campin and Jan van Eyck in the 1420s and lasts at least until the death of Gerard David in 1523, although many scholars extend it to the beginning of the Dutch Revolt in 1566 or 1568 – Max J. Friedländer's acclaimed surveys run through Pieter Bruegel the Elder. Early Netherlandish painting coincides with the Early and High Italian Renaissance, but the early period (until about 1500) is seen as an independent artistic evolution, separate from the Renaissance humanism that characterised developments in Italy. Beginning in the 1490s, as increasing numbers of Netherlandish and other Northern painters traveled to Italy, Renaissance ideals and painting styles were incorporated into northern painting. As a result, Early Netherlandish painters are often categorised as belonging to both the Northern Renaissance and the Late or International Gothic.

The major Netherlandish painters include Campin, van Eyck, Rogier van der Weyden, Dieric Bouts, Petrus Christus, Hans Memling, Hugo van der Goes and Hieronymus Bosch. These artists made significant advances in natural representation and illusionism, and their work typically features complex iconography. Their subjects are usually religious scenes or small portraits, with narrative painting or mythological subjects being relatively rare. Landscape is often richly described but relegated as a background detail before the early 16th century. The painted works are generally in oils on panel, either as single panels or more complex portable or fixed altarpieces in the form of diptychs, triptychs or polyptychs. The period is also noted for its sculpture, tapestries, illuminated manuscripts, stained glass and carved retables.

The first generations of artists were active during the height of Burgundian influence in Europe, when the Low Countries became the political and economic centre of Northern Europe, noted for their crafts and luxury goods. Assisted by the workshop system, panels and a variety of crafts were sold to foreign princes or merchants through private engagement or market stalls. A majority of the works were destroyed during waves of iconoclasm in the 16th and 17th centuries; today only a few thousand examples survive.

Early northern art in general was not well regarded from the early 17th to the mid-19th century, and the painters and their works were not well documented until the mid-19th century. Art historians spent almost another century determining attributions, studying iconography, and establishing bare outlines of even the major artists' lives; attribution of some of the most significant works is still debated. Scholarship of Early Netherlandish painting was one of the main activities of 19th- and 20th-century art history, and a major focus of two of the most important art historians of the 20th century: Max J. Friedländer (From Van Eyck to Breugel and Early Netherlandish Painting) and Erwin Panofsky (Early Netherlandish Painting only covering artists up to Hieronymus Bosch who died in 1516).

== Terminology and scope ==
The term "Early Netherlandish art" applies broadly to painters active during the 15th and 16th centuries in the northern European areas controlled by the Dukes of Burgundy and later the Habsburg dynasty. These artists became an early driving force behind the Northern Renaissance and the move away from the Gothic style. In this political and art-historical context, the north follows the Burgundian lands which straddled areas that encompass parts of modern France, Germany, Belgium, Luxembourg, and the Netherlands.

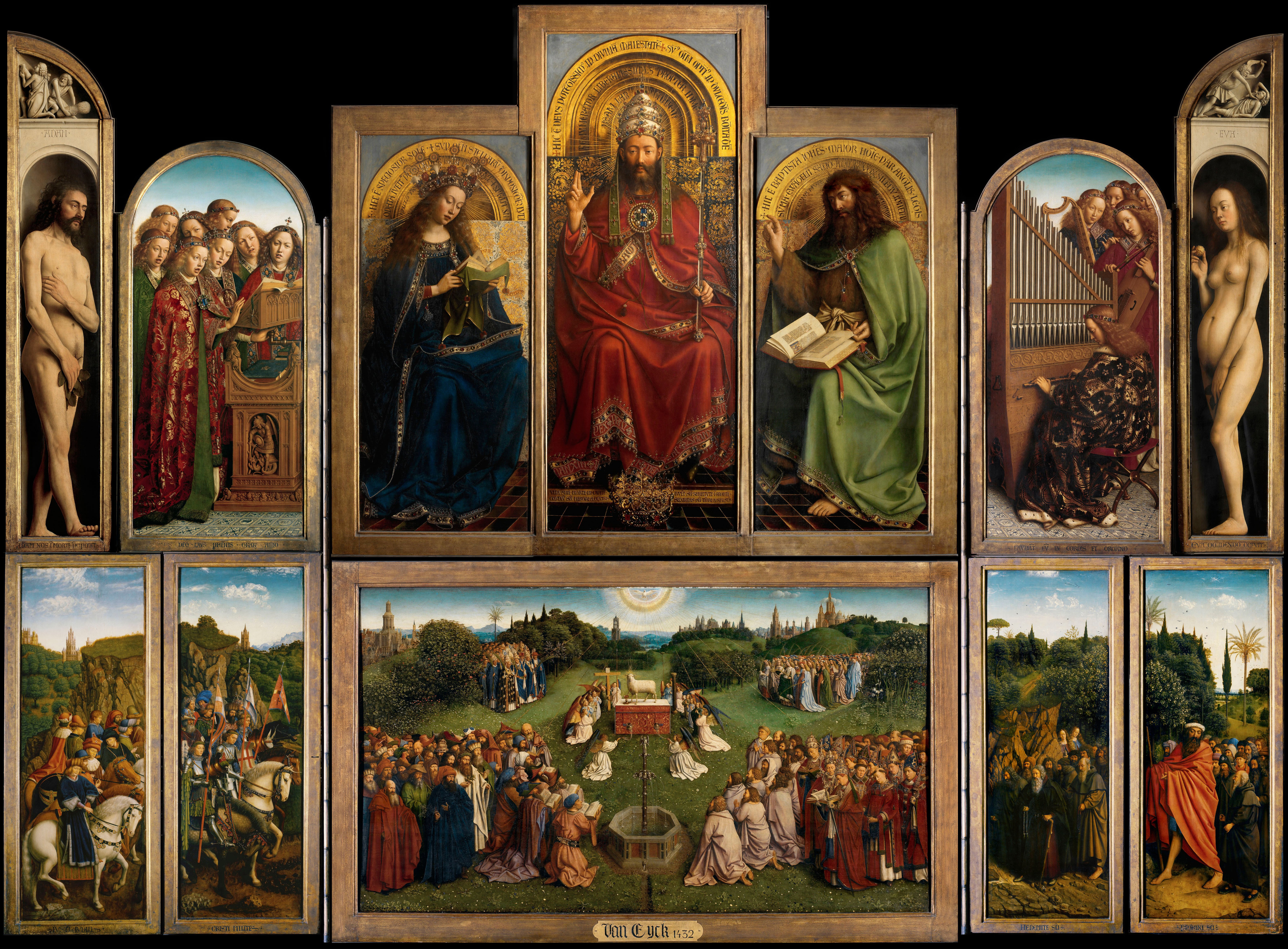
The Ghent Altarpiece, completed in 1432 by Hubert and Jan van Eyck. This polyptych and the Turin-Milan Hours are generally seen as the first major works of the Early Netherlandish period.

The Netherlandish artists have been known by a variety of terms. "Late Gothic" is an early designation which emphasises continuity with the art of the Middle Ages. In the early 20th century, the artists were variously referred to in English as the "Ghent-Bruges school" or the "Old Netherlandish school". "Flemish Primitives" is a traditional art-historical term borrowed from the French primitifs flamands that became popular after the famous exhibition in Bruges in 1902 (Note: Flemish and Netherlandish art were only distinguished from each other from the early 17th century. See Spronk (1997), 7) and remains in use today, especially in Dutch and German. In this context, "primitive" does not refer to a perceived lack of sophistication, but rather identifies the artists as originators of a new tradition in painting. Erwin Panofsky preferred the term ars nova ("new art"), which linked the movement with innovative composers of music such as Guillaume Dufay and Gilles Binchois, who were favoured by the Burgundian court over artists attached to the lavish French court. When the Burgundian dukes established centres of power in the Netherlands, they brought with them a more cosmopolitan outlook. According to Otto Pächt a simultaneous shift in art began sometime between 1406 and 1420 when a "revolution took place in painting"; a "new beauty" in art emerged, one that depicted the visible rather than the metaphysical world.

In the 19th century, the Early Netherlandish artists were classified by nationality, with Jan van Eyck identified as German and van der Weyden (born Roger de la Pasture) as French. Scholars were at times preoccupied as to whether the school's genesis was in France or Germany. These arguments and distinctions dissipated after World War I, and following the leads of Friedländer, Panofsky, and Pächt, English-language scholars now almost universally describe the period as "Early Netherlandish painting", although many art historians view the Flemish term as more correct.

In the 14th century, as Gothic art gave way to the International Gothic era, a number of schools developed in northern Europe. Early Netherlandish art originated in French courtly art, and is especially tied to the tradition and conventions of illuminated manuscripts. Modern art historians see the era as beginning with 14th-century manuscript illuminators. They were followed by panel painters such as Melchior Broederlam and Robert Campin, the latter generally considered the first Early Netherlandish master, under whom van der Weyden served his apprenticeship. Illumination reached a peak in the region in the decades after 1400, mainly due to the patronage of Burgundian and House of Valois-Anjou dukes such as Philip the Bold, Louis I of Anjou and Jean, Duke of Berry. This patronage continued in the low countries with the Burgundian dukes, Philip the Good and his son Charles the Bold. The demand for illuminated manuscripts declined towards the end of the century, perhaps because of the costly production process in comparison to panel painting. Yet illumination remained popular at the luxury end of the market, and prints, both engravings and woodcuts, found a new mass market, especially those by artists such as Martin Schongauer and Albrecht Dürer.

Hieronymus Bosch, The Garden of Earthly Delights, c. 1490–1510. Museo del Prado, Madrid. Art historians are divided as to whether the central panel was intended as a moral warning or as a panorama of paradise lost.

Following van Eyck's innovations, the first generation of Netherlandish painters emphasised light and shadow, elements usually absent from 14th-century illuminated manuscripts. Biblical scenes were depicted with more naturalism, which made their content more accessible to viewers, while individual portraits became more evocative and alive. Johan Huizinga said that art of the era was meant to be fully integrated with daily routine, to "fill with beauty" the devotional life in a world closely tied to the liturgy and sacraments. After about 1500 a number of factors turned against the pervasive Northern style, not least the rise of Italian art, whose commercial appeal began to rival Netherlandish art by 1510, and overtook it some ten years later. Two events symbolically and historically reflect this shift: the transporting of a marble Madonna and Child by Michelangelo to Bruges in 1506, and the arrival of Raphael's tapestry cartoons to Brussels in 1517, which were widely seen while in the city. Although the influence of Italian art was soon widespread across the north, it in turn had drawn on the 15th-century northern painters, with Michelangelo's Madonna based on a type developed by Hans Memling.

Netherlandish painting ends in the narrowest sense with the death of Gerard David in 1523. A number of mid- and late-16th-century artists maintained many of the conventions, and they are frequently but not always associated with the school. The style of these painters is often dramatically at odds with that of the first generation of artists. In the early 16th century, artists began to explore illusionistic depictions of three dimensions. The painting of the early 16th century can be seen as leading directly from the artistic innovations and iconography of the previous century, with some painters, following the traditional and established formats and symbolism of the previous century, continuing to produce copies of previously painted works. Others came under the influence of Renaissance humanism, turning towards secular narrative cycles, as biblical imagery was blended with mythological themes. A full break from the mid-15th-century style and subject matter was not seen until the development of Northern Mannerism around 1590. There was considerable overlap, and the early- to mid-16th-century innovations can be tied to the Mannerist style, including naturalistic secular portraiture, the depiction of ordinary (as opposed to courtly) life, and the development of elaborate landscapes and cityscapes that were more than background views.

== Chronology ==
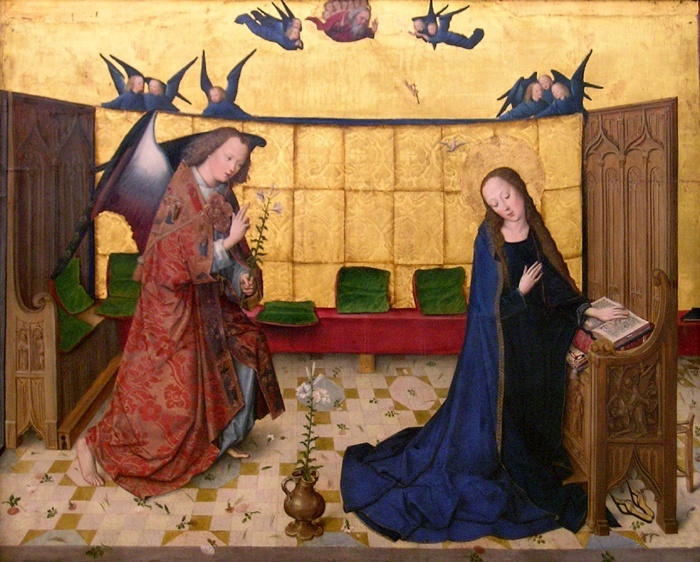
Master of the Life of the Virgin, a late Gothic Annunciation, c. 1463–1490. Alte Pinakothek, Munich

The origins of the Early Netherlandish school lie in the miniature paintings of the late Gothic period. This was first seen in manuscript illumination, which after 1380 conveyed new levels of realism, perspective and skill in rendering colour, peaking with the Limbourg brothers and the Netherlandish artist known as Hand G, to whom the most significant leaves of the Turin-Milan Hours are usually attributed. Although his identity has not been definitively established, Hand G, who contributed c. 1420, is thought to have been either Jan van Eyck or his brother Hubert. According to Georges Hulin de Loo, Hand G's contributions to the Turin-Milan Hours "constitute the most marvelous group of paintings that have ever decorated any book, and, for their period, the most astounding work known to the history of art".

Jan van Eyck's use of oil as a medium was a significant development, allowing artists far greater manipulation of paint. The 16th-century art historian Giorgio Vasari claimed van Eyck invented the use of oil paint; a claim that, while exaggerated, indicates the extent to which van Eyck helped disseminate the technique. Van Eyck employed a new level of virtuosity, mainly from taking advantage of the fact that oil dries so slowly; this gave him more time and more scope for blending and mixing layers of different pigments, and his technique was quickly adopted and refined by both Robert Campin and Rogier van der Weyden. These three artists are considered the first rank and most influential of the early generation of Early Netherlandish painters. Their influence was felt across northern Europe, from Bohemia and Poland in the east to Austria and Swabia in the south.

Jan van Eyck, Portrait of a Man in a Turban, 1433; possible self-portrait. National Gallery, London

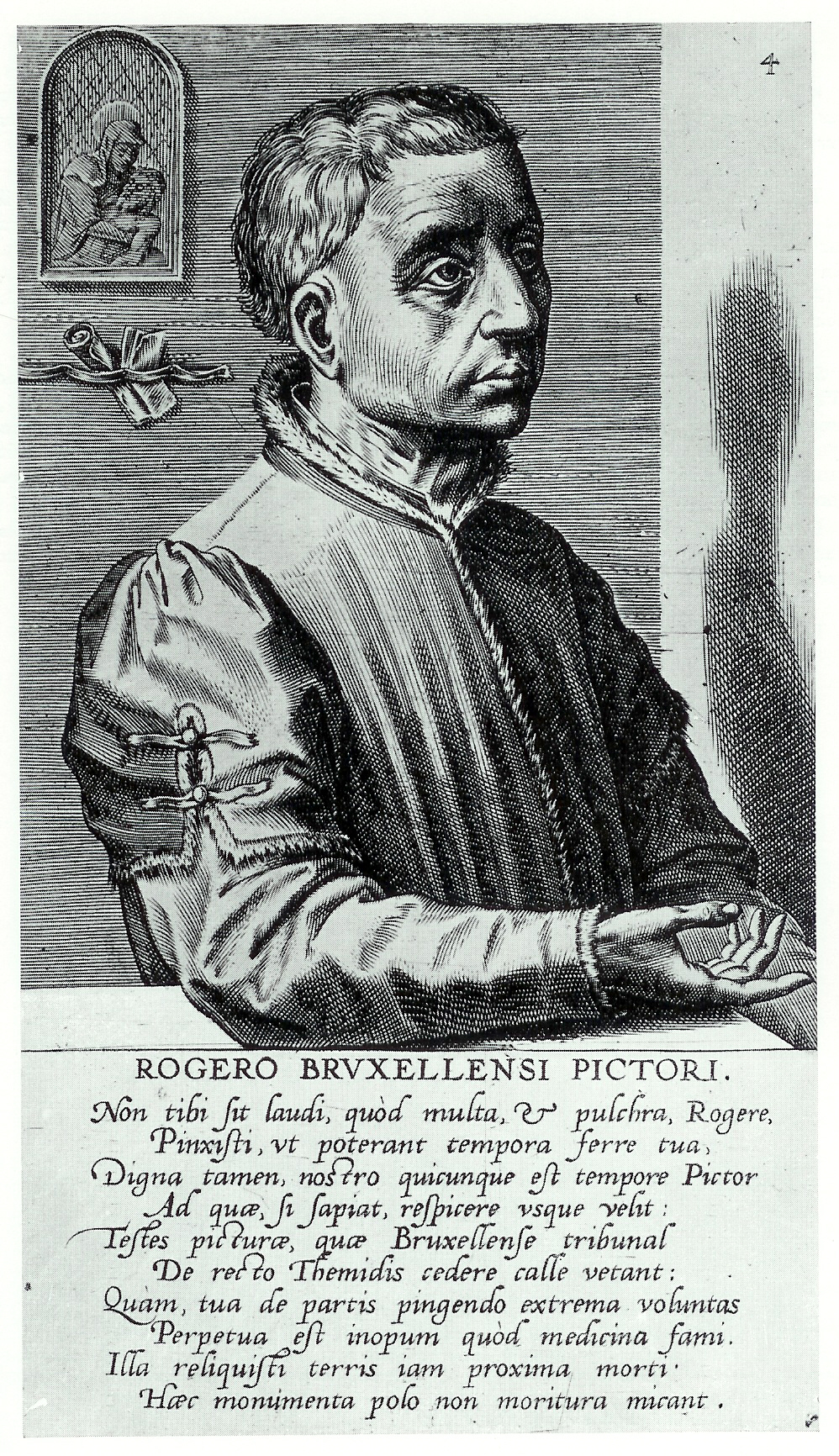
Cornelis Cort, portrait of Rogier van der Weyden, 1572

A number of artists traditionally associated with the movement had origins that were neither Dutch nor Flemish in the modern sense. Van der Weyden was born Roger de la Pasture in Tournai. The German Hans Memling and the Estonian Michael Sittow both worked in the Netherlands in a fully Netherlandish style. Simon Marmion is often regarded as an Early Netherlandish painter because he came from Amiens, an area intermittently ruled by the Burgundian court between 1435 and 1471. The Burgundian duchy was at its peak influence, and the innovations made by the Netherlandish painters were soon recognised across the continent. By the time of van Eyck's death, his paintings were sought by wealthy patrons across Europe. Copies of his works were widely circulated, a fact that greatly contributed to the spread of the Netherlandish style to central and southern Europe. Central European art was then under the dual influence of innovations from Italy and from the north. Often the exchange of ideas between the Low Countries and Italy led to patronage from nobility such as Matthias Corvinus, King of Hungary, who commissioned manuscripts from both traditions.

The first generation were literate, well educated and mostly from middle-class backgrounds. Van Eyck and van der Weyden were both highly placed in the Burgundian court, with van Eyck in particular assuming roles for which an ability to read Latin was necessary; inscriptions found on his panels indicate that he had a good knowledge of both Latin and Greek. (Note: Van Eyck used elements of the Greek alphabet in his signature, and a number of Ghent painters taught members of their workshops to read and write.) A number of artists were financially successful and much sought after in the Low Countries and by patrons across Europe. Many artists, including David and Bouts, could afford to donate large works to the churches, monasteries and convents of their choosing. Van Eyck was a valet de chambre at the Burgundian court and had easy access to Philip the Good. Van der Weyden was a prudent investor in stocks and property; Bouts was commercially minded and married the heiress Catherine "Mettengelde" ("with the money"). Vrancke van der Stockt invested in land.

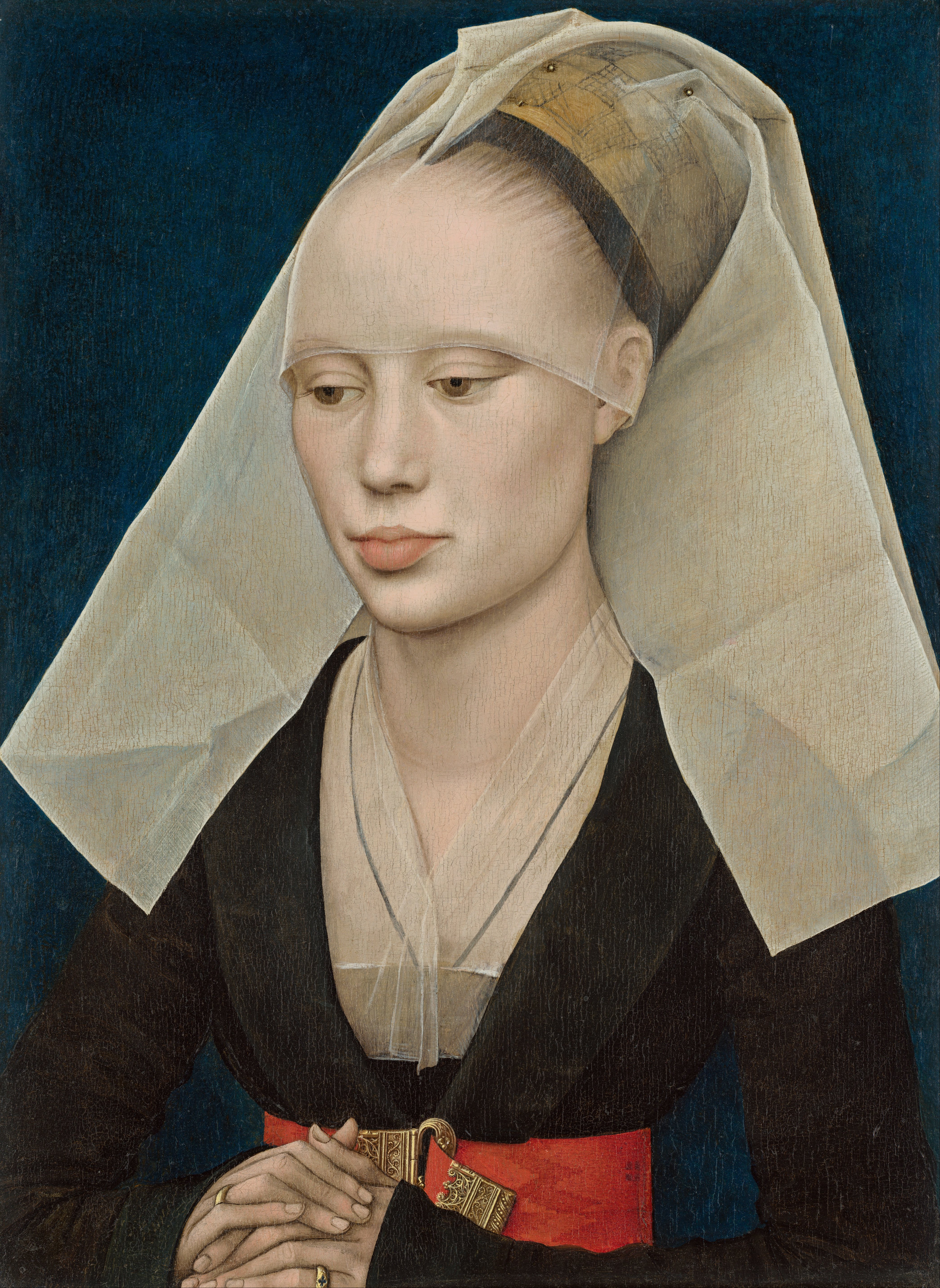
Rogier van der Weyden, Portrait of a Lady, 1460. National Gallery of Art, Washington. Van der Weyden moved portraiture away from idealisation and towards more naturalistic representation.

The Early Netherlandish masters' influence reached artists such as Stefan Lochner and the painter known as the Master of the Life of the Virgin, both of whom, working in mid-15th-century Cologne, drew inspiration from imported works by van der Weyden and Bouts. New and distinctive painterly cultures sprang up; Ulm, Nuremberg, Vienna and Munich were the most important artistic centres in the Holy Roman Empire at the start of the 16th century. There was a rise in demand for printmaking (using woodcuts or copperplate engraving) and other innovations borrowed from France and southern Italy. Some 16th-century painters borrowed heavily from the previous century's techniques and styles. Even progressive artists such as Jan Gossaert made copies, such as his reworking of van Eyck's Madonna in the Church. Gerard David linked the styles of Bruges and Antwerp, often travelling between the cities. He moved to Antwerp in 1505, when Quentin Matsys was the head of the local painters' guild, and the two became friends.

By the 16th century the iconographic innovations and painterly techniques developed by van Eyck had become standard throughout northern Europe. Albrecht Dürer emulated van Eyck's precision. Painters enjoyed a new level of respect and status; patrons no longer simply commissioned works but courted the artists, sponsoring their travel and exposing them to new and wide-ranging influences. Hieronymus Bosch, active in the late 15th and early 16th centuries, remains one of the most important and popular of the Netherlandish painters. He was anomalous in that he largely forwent realistic depictions of nature, human existence and perspective, while his work is almost entirely free of Italian influences. His better-known works are instead characterised by fantastical elements that tend towards the hallucinatory, drawing to some extent from the vision of hell in van Eyck's Crucifixion and Last Judgement diptych. Bosch followed his own muse, tending instead towards moralism and pessimism. His paintings, especially the triptychs, are among the most significant and accomplished of the late Netherlandish period.

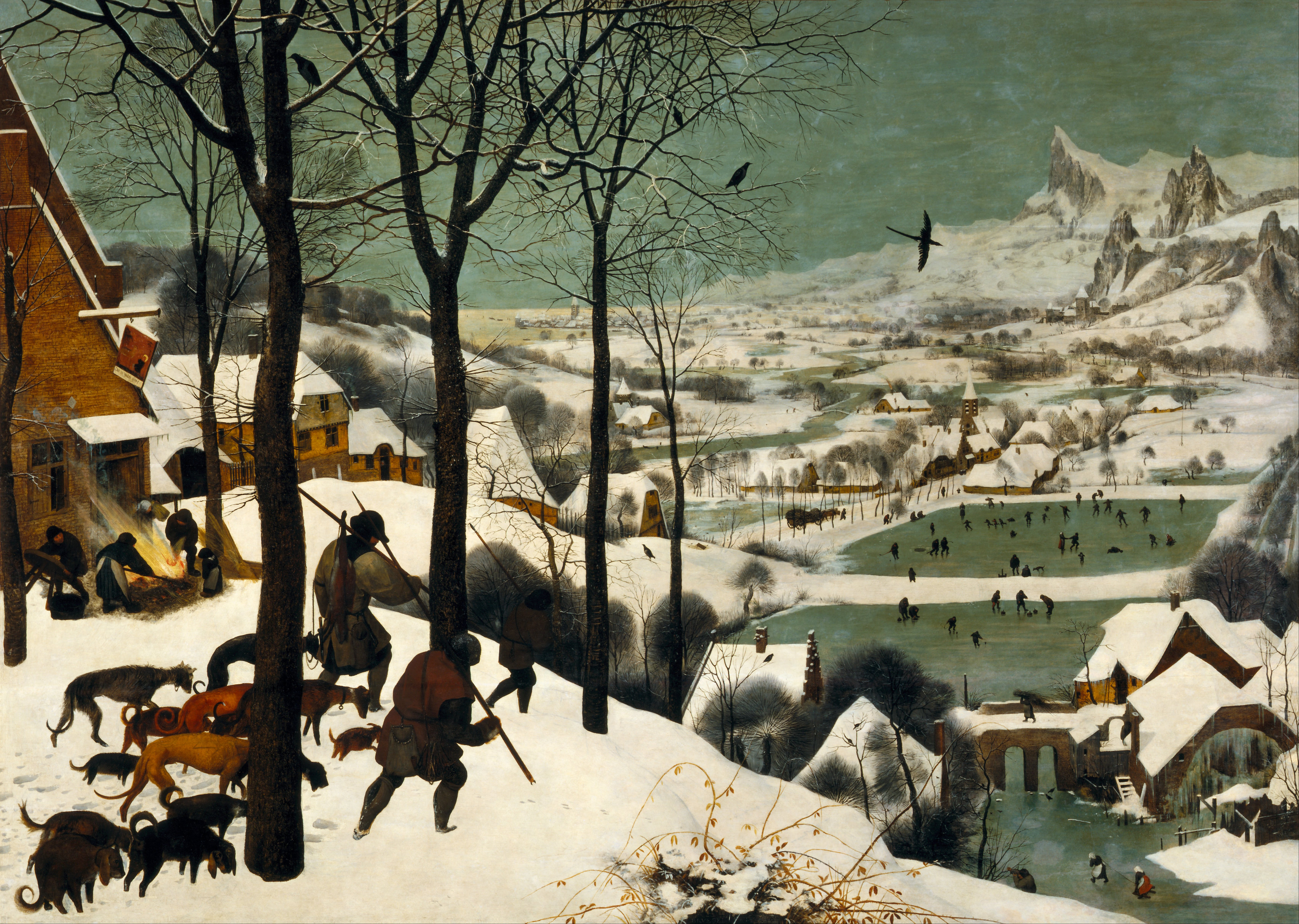
Pieter Bruegel the Elder, The Hunters in the Snow, 1565. Kunsthistorisches Museum, Vienna. The most famous of Bruegel's several winter landscapes, the panel is indicative of how painting in the mid-16th century tended towards the secular and everyday life.

The Reformation brought changes in outlook and artistic expression as secular and landscape imagery overtook biblical scenes. Sacred imagery was shown in a didactic and moralistic manner, with religious figures becoming marginalized and relegated to the background. Pieter Bruegel the Elder, one of the few who followed Bosch's style, is an important bridge between the Early Netherlandish artists and their successors. His work retains many 15th-century conventions, but his perspective and subjects are distinctly modern. Sweeping landscapes came to the fore in paintings that were provisionally religious or mythological, and his genre scenes were complex, with overtones of religious skepticism and even hints of nationalism.

== Technique and material ==
Campin, van Eyck and van der Weyden established naturalism as the dominant style in 15th-century northern European painting. These artists sought to show the world as it actually was, and to depict people in a way that made them look more human, with a greater complexity of emotions than had been previously seen. This first generation of Early Netherlandish artists were interested in the accurate reproduction of objects (according to Panofsky they painted "gold that looked like gold"), paying close attention to natural phenomena such as light, shadow and reflection. They moved beyond the flat perspective and outlined figuration of earlier painting in favour of three-dimensional pictorial spaces. The position of viewers and how they might relate to the scene became important for the first time; in the Arnolfini Portrait, van Eyck arranges the scene as if the viewer has just entered the room containing the two figures. Advancements in technique allowed far richer, more luminous and closely detailed representations of people, landscapes, interiors and objects.

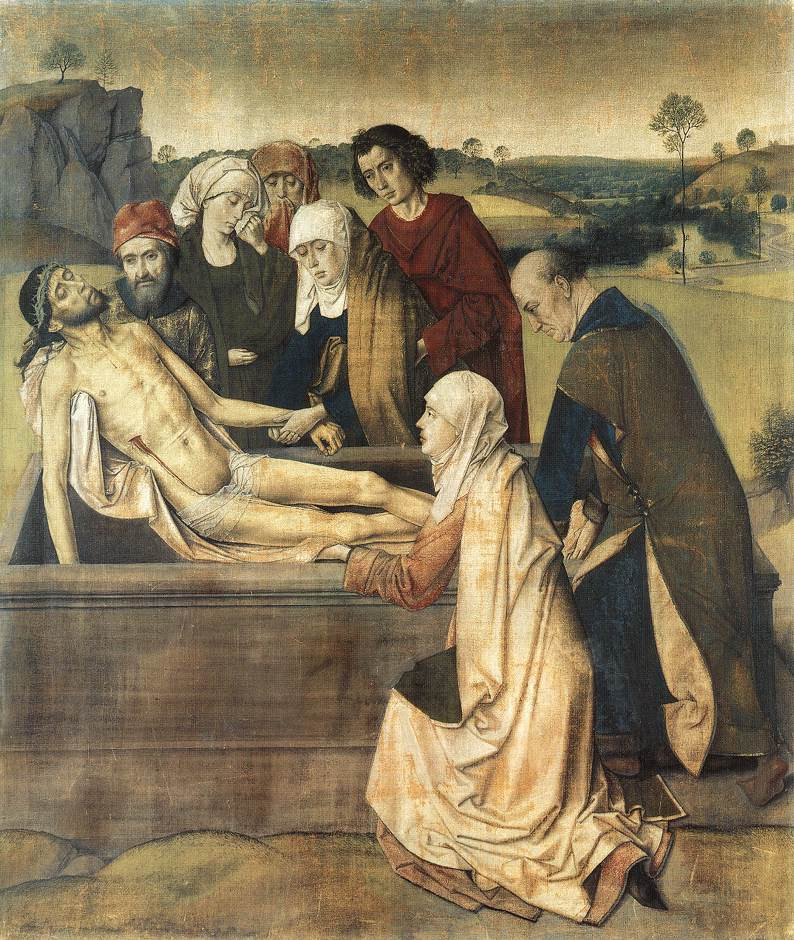
Dieric Bouts' Entombment, c. 1440–1455 (National Gallery, London), is an austere but affecting portrayal of sorrow and grief, and one of the few surviving 15th-century glue-size paintings.

Although the use of oil as a binding agent can be traced to the 12th century, innovations in its handling and manipulation define the era. Egg tempera was the dominant medium until the 1430s, and while it produces both bright and light colours, it dries quickly and is a difficult medium in which to achieve naturalistic textures or deep shadows. Oil allows smooth, translucent surfaces and can be applied in a range of thicknesses, from fine lines to thick broad strokes. It dries slowly and is easily manipulated while still wet. These characteristics allowed more time to add subtle detail and enable wet-on-wet techniques. Smooth transitions of colour are possible because portions of the intermediary layers of paint can be wiped or removed as the paint dries. Oil enables differentiation among degrees of reflective light, from shadow to bright beams, and minute depictions of light effects through the use of transparent glazes. This new freedom in controlling light effects gave rise to more precise and realistic depictions of surface textures; van Eyck and van der Weyden typically show light falling on surfaces such as jewellery, wooden floors, textiles and household objects.

The paintings were most often made on wood, but sometimes on the less expensive canvas. (Note: From contemporary records, it is estimated that about a third were painted on canvas, but as these were far less durable, most extant works are on wooden panels. See Ridderbos (2005), 297) The wood was usually oak, often imported from the Baltic region, with the preference for radially cut boards which are less likely to warp. Typically the sap was removed and the board well-seasoned before use. Wood supports allow for dendrochronological dating, and the particular use of Baltic oak gives clues as to the artist's location. The panels generally show very high degrees of craftsmanship. Lorne Campbell notes that most are "beautifully made and finished objects. It can be extremely difficult to find the joins". Many paintings' frames were altered, repainted or gilded in the 18th and early 19th centuries when it was common practice to break apart hinged Netherlandish pieces so they could be sold as genre pieces. Many surviving panels are painted on both sides or with the reverse bearing family emblems, crests or ancillary outline sketches. In the case of single panels, the markings on the reverse are often wholly unrelated to the obverse and may be later additions, or as Campbell speculates, "done for the artist's amusement". Painting each side of a panel was practical since it prevented the wood from warping. Usually the frames of hinged works were constructed before the individual panels were worked on.

Glue binder was often used as an inexpensive alternative to oil. Many works using this medium were produced but few survive today because of the delicateness of the linen cloth and the solubility of the hide glue from which the binder was derived. Well known and relatively well preserved – though substantially damaged – examples include Matsys' Virgin and Child with Saints Barbara and Catherine (c. 1415–25) and Bouts' Entombment (c. 1440–55). The paint was generally applied with brushes or sometimes with thin sticks or brush handles. The artists often softened the contours of shadows with their fingers, at times to blot or reduce the glaze.

== Guilds and workshops ==
The most usual way in the 15th century for a patron to commission a piece was to visit a master's workshop. Only a certain number of masters could operate within any city's bounds; they were regulated by artisan guilds to whom they had to be affiliated to be allowed to operate and receive commissions. Guilds protected and regulated painting, overseeing production, export trade and raw material supply; and they maintained discrete sets of rules for panel painters, cloth painters and book illuminators. For example, the rules set higher citizenship requirements for miniaturists and prohibited them from using oils. Overall, panel painters enjoyed the highest level of protection, with cloth painters ranking below.

Membership of a guild was highly restricted and access was difficult for newcomers. A master was expected to serve an apprenticeship in his region, and show proof of citizenship, which could be obtained through birth in the city or by purchase. Apprenticeship lasted four to five years, ending with the production of a "masterpiece" that proved his ability as a craftsman, and the payment of a substantial entrance fee. The system was protectionist at a local level through the nuances of the fee system. Although it sought to ensure a high quality of membership, it was a self-governing body that tended to favour wealthy applicants. Guild connections sometimes appear in paintings, most famously in van der Weyden's Descent from the Cross, in which Christ's body is given the t-shape of a crossbow to reflect its commission for a chapel for the Leuven guild of archers.

Workshops typically consisted of a family home for the master and lodging for apprentices. The masters usually built up inventories of pre-painted panels as well as patterns or outline designs for ready sale. With the former, the master was responsible for the overall design of the painting, and typically painted the focal portions, such as the faces, hands and the embroidered parts of the figure's clothing. The more prosaic elements would be left to assistants; in many works it is possible to discern abrupt shifts in style, with the relatively weak Deesis passage in van Eyck's Crucifixion and Last Judgement diptych being a better-known example. Often a master's workshop was occupied with both the reproduction of copies of proven commercially successful works, and the design of new compositions arising from commissions. In this case, the master would usually produce the underdrawing or overall composition to be painted by assistants. As a result, many surviving works that evidence first-rank compositions but uninspired execution are attributed to workshop members or followers.

== Patronage ==
By the 15th century the reach and influence of the Burgundian princes meant that the Low Countries' merchant and banker classes were in the ascendancy. The early to mid-century saw great rises in international trade and domestic wealth, leading to an enormous increase in the demand for art. Artists from the area attracted patronage from the Baltic coast, the north German and Polish regions, the Iberian Peninsula, Italy and the powerful families of England and Scotland. At first, masters had acted as their own dealers, attending fairs where they could also buy frames, panels and pigments. The mid-century saw the development of art dealership as a profession; the activity became purely commercially driven, dominated by the mercantile class.

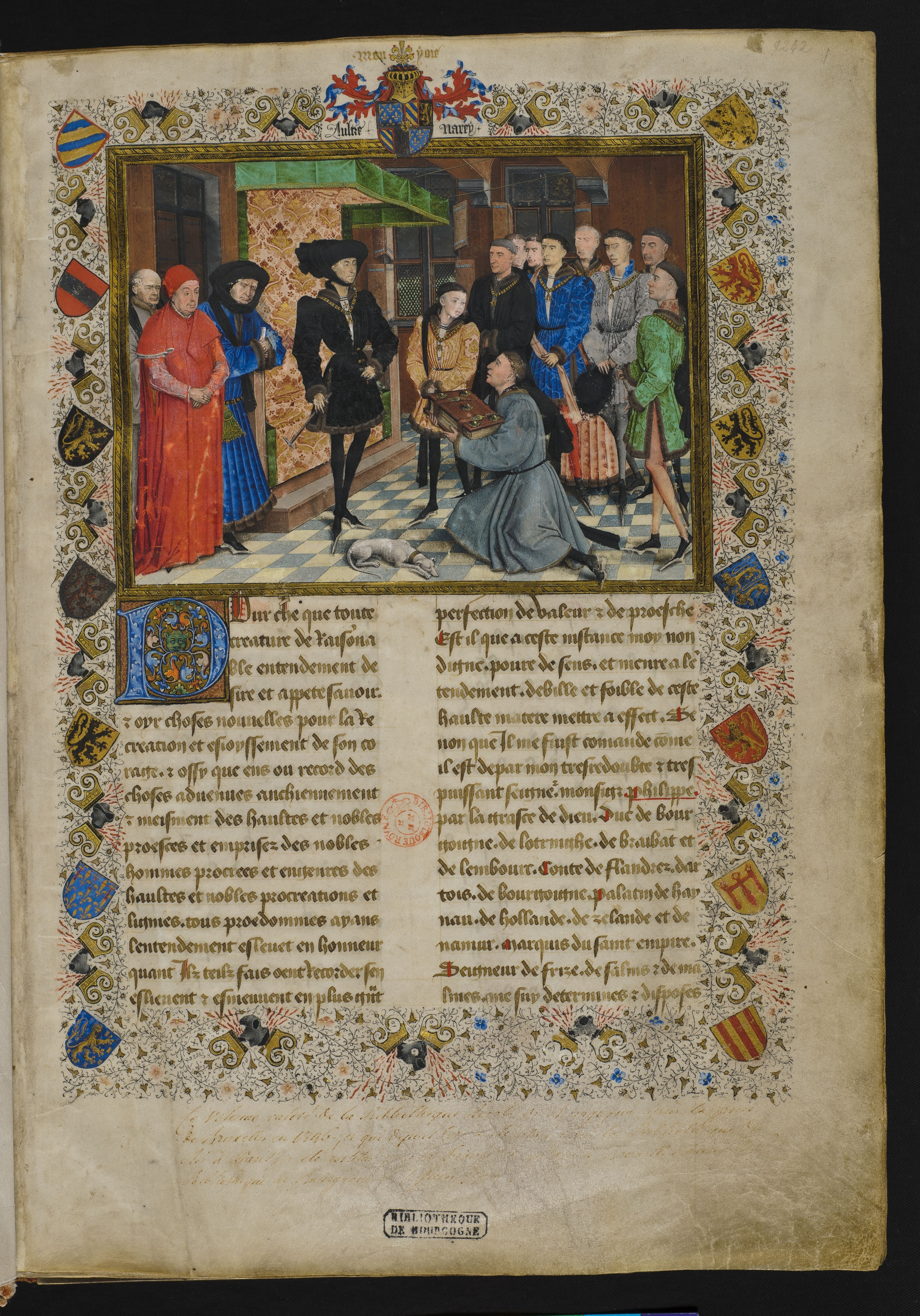
Rogier van der Weyden, Jean Wauquelin presenting his 'Chroniques de Hainaut' to Philip the Good, presentation miniature, 1447–1448. Royal Library of Belgium, Brussels.

Smaller works were not usually produced on commission. More often the masters anticipated the formats and images that would be most sought after and their designs were then developed by workshop members. Ready made paintings were sold at regularly held fairs, or the buyers could visit workshops, which tended to be clustered in certain areas of the major cities. The masters were allowed to display in their front windows. This was the typical mode for the thousands of panels produced for the middle class – city officials, clergy, guild members, doctors and merchants.

Less expensive cloth paintings (tüchlein) were more common in middle-class households, and records show a strong interest in domestically owned religious panel paintings. Members of the merchant class typically commissioned smaller devotional panels, containing specified subject matter. Alterations varied from having individualised panels added to a prefabricated pattern, to the inclusion of a donor portrait. The addition of coats-of-arms were often the only change – an addition seen in van der Weyden's Saint Luke Drawing the Virgin, which exists in several variations.

Many of the Burgundian dukes could afford to be extravagant in their taste. Philip the Good followed the example set earlier in France by his great-uncles including Jean, Duke of Berry by becoming a strong patron of the arts and commissioning a large number of artworks. The Burgundian court was seen as the arbiter of taste and their appreciation in turn drove demand for highly luxurious and expensive illuminated manuscripts, gold-edged tapestries and jewel-bordered cups. Their appetite for finery trickled down through their court and nobles to the people who for the most part commissioned local artists in Bruges and Ghent in the 1440s and 1450s. While Netherlandish panel paintings did not have intrinsic value as did for example objects in precious metals, they were perceived as precious objects and in the first rank of European art. A 1425 document written by Philip the Good explains that he hired a painter for the "excellent work that he does in his craft". Jan van Eyck painted the Annunciation while in Philip's employ, and Rogier van der Weyden became the duke's portrait painter in the 1440s.

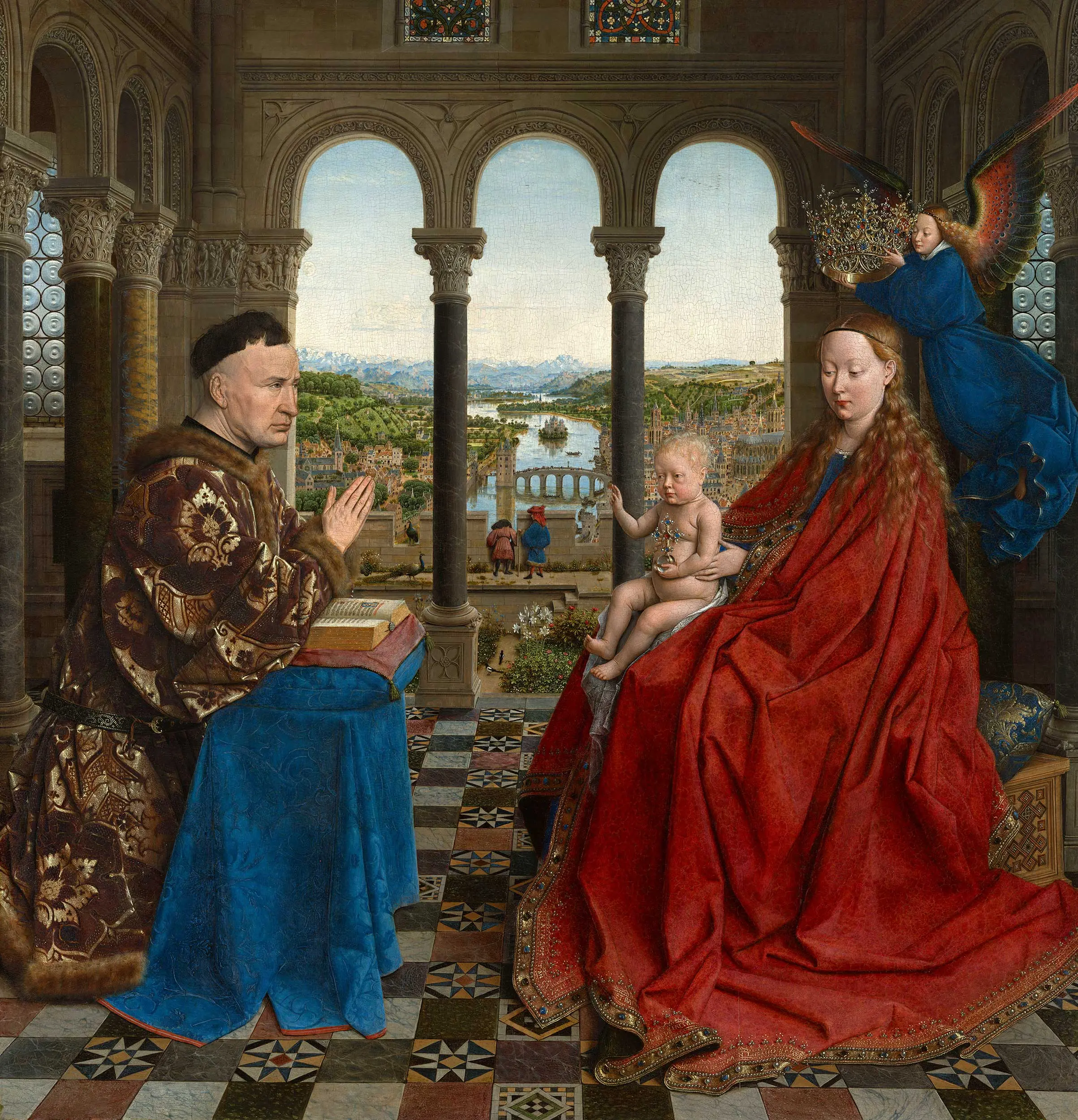
Jan van Eyck, Madonna of Chancellor Rolin, c. 1435

Burgundian rule created a large class of courtiers and functionaries. Some gained enormous power and commissioned paintings to display their wealth and influence. Civic leaders also commissioned works from major artists, such as Bouts' Justice for Emperor Otto III, van der Weyden's The Justice of Trajan and Herkinbald and David's Justice of Cambyses. Civic commissions were less common and were not as lucrative, but they brought notice to and increased a painter's reputation, as with Memling, whose St John Altarpiece for Bruges' Sint-Janshospitaal brought him additional civic commissions.

Wealthy foreign patronage and the development of international trade afforded the established masters the chance to build up workshops with assistants. Although first-rank painters such as Petrus Christus and Hans Memling found patrons among the local nobility, they catered specifically to the large foreign population in Bruges. Painters not only exported goods but also themselves; foreign princes and nobility, striving to emulate the opulence of the Burgundian court, hired painters away from Bruges. (Note: The Duke of Urbino hired Joos van Gent in c. 1473, and Isabella I of Castile – who owned a collection of 300 paintings – hired Michael Sittow and Juan de Flandes ("John of Flanders") into her service. See Ainsworth (1998a), 25–26)

== Iconography ==
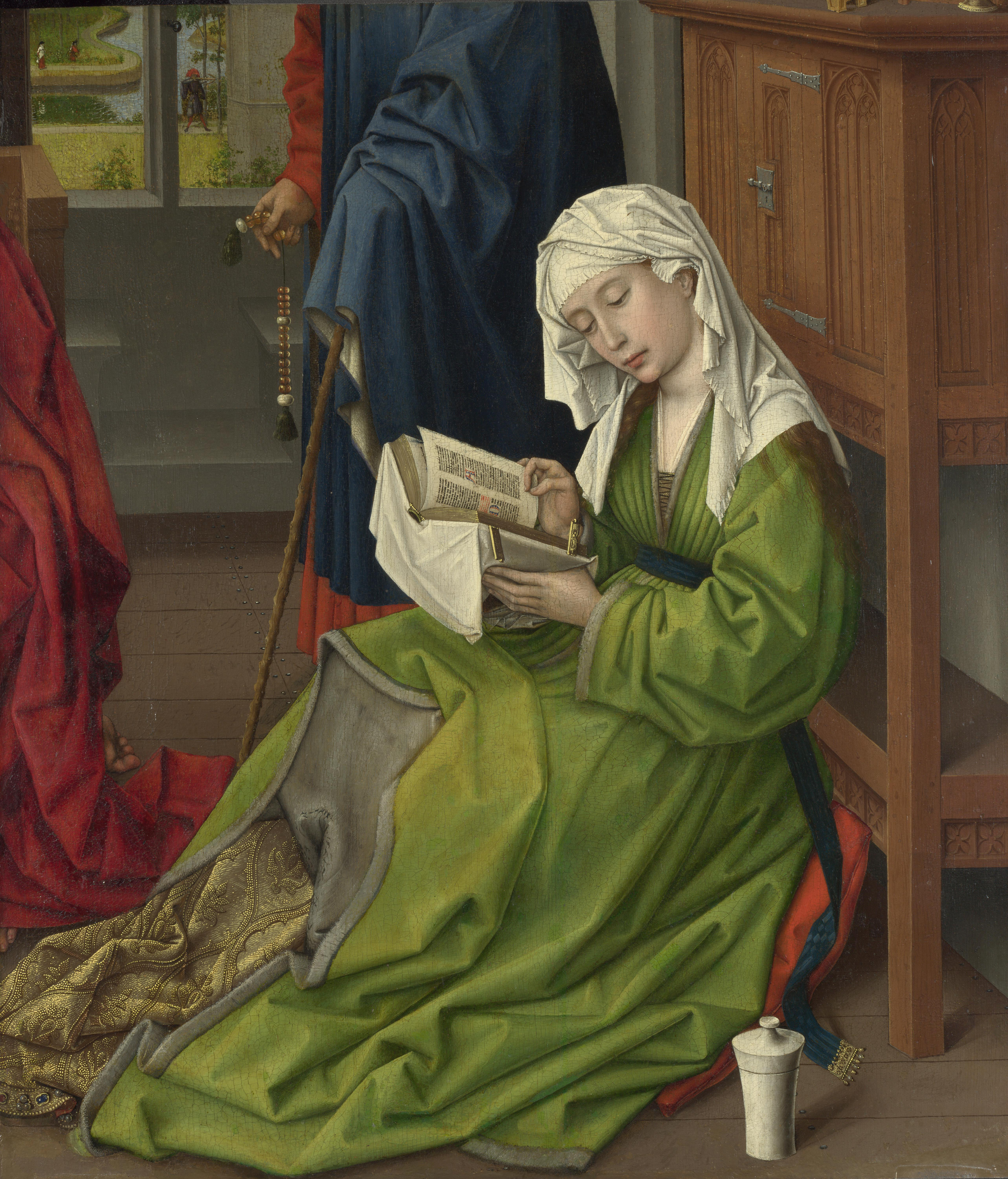
Rogier van der Weyden, The Magdalen Reading, before 1438. National Gallery, London. This fragment is unusually rich in iconographical detail, including the Magdalen's averted eyes, her attribute of ointment, and the concept of Christ as the word represented by the book in her hands.

The paintings of the first generation of Netherlandish artists are often characterised by the use of symbolism and biblical references. Van Eyck pioneered, and his innovations were taken up and developed by van der Weyden, Memling and Christus. Each employed rich and complex iconographical elements to create a heightened sense of contemporary beliefs and spiritual ideals. Morally the works express a fearful outlook, combined with a respect for restraint and stoicism. The paintings above all emphasise the spiritual over the earthly. Because the cult of Mary was at an apex at the time, iconographic elements related to the Life of Mary vastly predominate.

Craig Harbison describes the blending of realism and symbolism as perhaps "the most important aspect of early Flemish art". The first generation of Netherlandish painters were preoccupied with making religious symbols more realistic. Van Eyck incorporated a wide variety of iconographic elements, often conveying what he saw as a co-existence of the spiritual and material worlds. The iconography was embedded in the work unobtrusively; typically the references comprised small but key background details. The embedded symbols were meant to meld into the scenes and were "a deliberate strategy to create an experience of spiritual revelation". Van Eyck's religious paintings in particular "always present the spectator with a transfigured view of visible reality". To him the day-to-day is harmoniously steeped in symbolism, such that, according to Harbison, "descriptive data were rearranged ... so that they illustrated not earthly existence but what he considered supernatural truth." This blend of the earthly and heavenly evidences van Eyck's belief that the "essential truth of Christian doctrine" can be found in "the marriage of secular and sacred worlds, of reality and symbol". He depicts overly large Madonnas, whose unrealistic size shows the separation between the heavenly from earthly, but placed them in everyday settings such as churches, domestic chambers or seated with court officials.

Yet the earthly churches are heavily decorated with heavenly symbols. A heavenly throne is clearly represented in some domestic chambers (for example in the Lucca Madonna). More difficult to discern are the settings for paintings such as Madonna of Chancellor Rolin, where the location is a fusion of the earthly and celestial. Van Eyck's iconography is often so densely and intricately layered that a work has to be viewed multiple times before even the most obvious meaning of an element is apparent. The symbols were often subtly woven into the paintings so that they only became apparent after close and repeated viewing, while much of the iconography reflects the idea that, according to John Ward, there is a "promised passage from sin and death to salvation and rebirth".

Other artists employed symbolism in a more prosaic manner, despite van Eyck's great influence on both his contemporaries and later artists. Campin showed a clear separation between spiritual and earthly realms; unlike van Eyck, he did not employ a programme of concealed symbolism. Campin's symbols do not alter the sense of the real; in his paintings a domestic scene is no more complicated than a one showing religious iconography, but one the viewer would recognise and understand. Van der Weyden's symbolism was far more nuanced than Campin's but not as dense as van Eyck's. According to Harbison, van der Weyden incorporated his symbols so carefully, and in such an exquisite manner, that "Neither the mystical union that results in his work, nor his reality itself for that matter, seems capable of being rationally analyzed, explained or reconstructed." His treatment of architectural details, niches, colour and space is presented in such an inexplicable manner that "the particular objects or people we see before us have suddenly, jarringly, become symbols with religious truth".

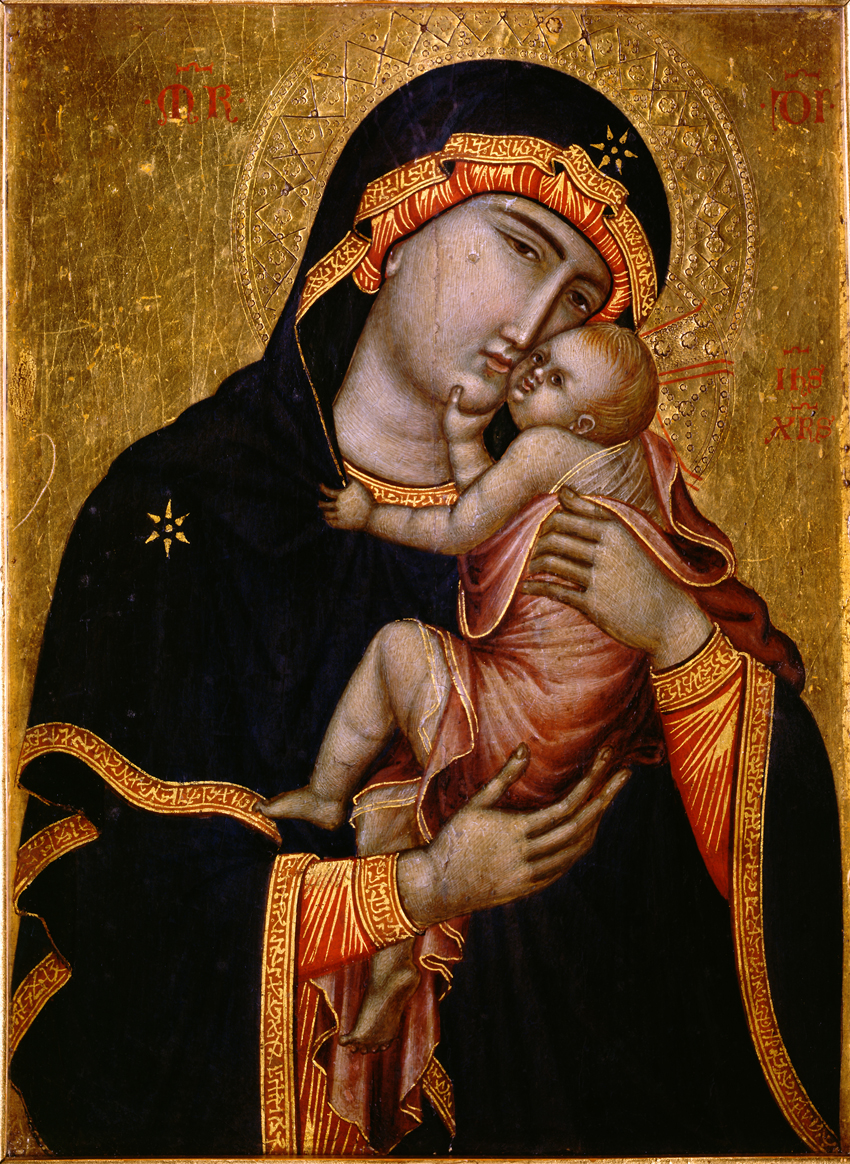
Anonymous, The Cambrai Madonna, c. 1340. Cambrai Cathedral, France. This small c. 1340 Italo-Byzantine copy was believed an original by Saint Luke and therefore widely copied.

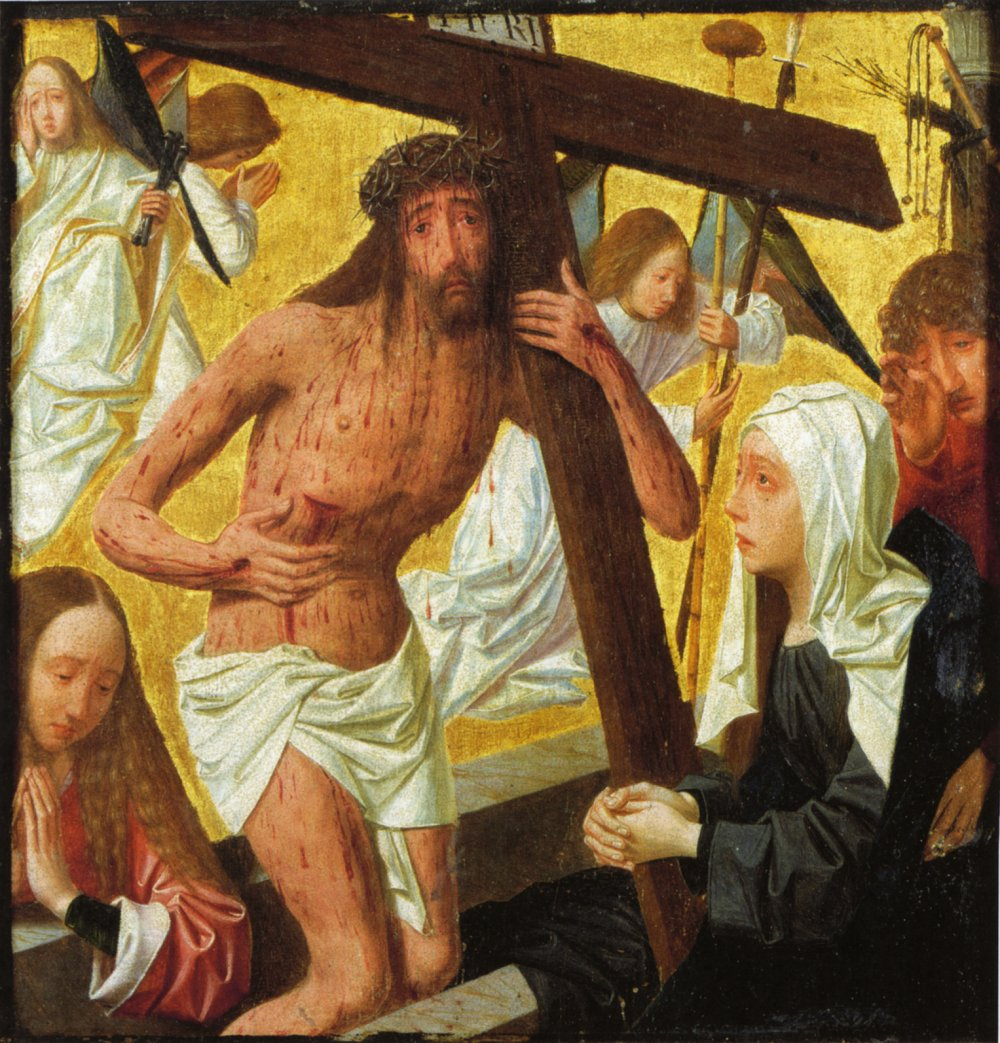
Geertgen tot Sint Jans, Man of Sorrows, c. 1485–1495. Museum Catharijneconvent, Utrecht. One of the finest examples of the "Man of Sorrows" tradition, this complex panel has been described as an "unflinching, yet emotive depiction of physical suffering".

Paintings and other precious objects served an important aid in the religious life of those who could afford them. Prayer and meditative contemplation were means to attain salvation, while the very wealthy could also build churches (or extend existing ones), or commission artworks or other devotional pieces as a means to guarantee salvation in the afterlife. Vast numbers of Virgin and Child paintings were produced, and original designs were widely copied and exported. Many of the paintings were based on Byzantine prototypes of the 12th and 13th centuries, of which the Cambrai Madonna is probably the best known. In this way the traditions of the earlier centuries were absorbed and re-developed as a distinctly rich and complex iconographical tradition.

Marian devotion grew from the 13th century, mostly forming around the concepts of the Immaculate Conception and her Assumption into heaven. In a culture that venerated the possession of relics as a means to bring the earthly closer to the divine, Mary left no bodily relics, thus assuming a special position between heaven and humanity. By the early 15th century, Mary had grown in importance within the Christian doctrine to the extent that she was commonly seen as the most accessible intercessor with God. It was thought that the length each person would need to suffer in limbo was proportional to their display of devotion while on earth. The veneration of Mary reached a peak in the early 15th century, an era that saw an unending demand for works depicting her likeness. From the mid-15th century, Netherlandish portrayals of the life of Christ tended to be centred on the iconography of the Man of Sorrows.

Those who could afford to commissioned donor portraits. Such a commission was usually executed as part of a triptych, or later as a more affordable diptych. Van der Weyden popularised the existing northern tradition of half-length Marian portraits. These echoed the "miracle-working" Byzantine icons then popular in Italy. The format became extremely popular across the north, and his innovations are an important contributing factor to the emergence of the Marian diptych.

== Formats ==
Although the Netherlandish artists are primarily known for their panel paintings, their output includes a variety of formats, including illuminated manuscripts, sculpture, tapestries, carved retables, stained glass, brass objects and carved tombs. According to art historian Susie Nash, by the early 16th century, the region led the field in almost every aspect of portable visual culture, "with specialist expertise and techniques of production at such a high level that no one else could compete with them". The Burgundian court favoured tapestry and metalwork, which are well recorded in surviving documentation, while demand for panel paintings is less evident – they may have been less suited to itinerant courts. Wall hangings and books functioned as political propaganda and as a means to showcase wealth and power, whereas portraits were less favoured. According to Maryan Ainsworth, those that were commissioned functioned to highlight lines of succession, such as van der Weyden's portrait of Charles the Bold; or for betrothals as in the case of van Eyck's lost Portrait of Isabella of Portugal.

Religious paintings were commissioned for royal and ducal palaces, for churches, hospitals, and convents, and for wealthy clerics and private donors. The richer cities and towns commissioned works for their civic buildings. Artists often worked in more than one medium; van Eyck and Petrus Christus are both thought to have contributed to manuscripts. Van der Weyden designed tapestries, though few survive. The Netherlandish painters were responsible for many innovations, including the advancement of the diptych format, the conventions of donor portraits, new conventions for Marian portraits, and, through works such as van Eyck's Madonna of Chancellor Rolin and van der Weyden's Saint Luke Drawing the Virgin in the 1430s, laying the foundation for the development of landscape painting as a separate genre.

=== Illuminated manuscript ===
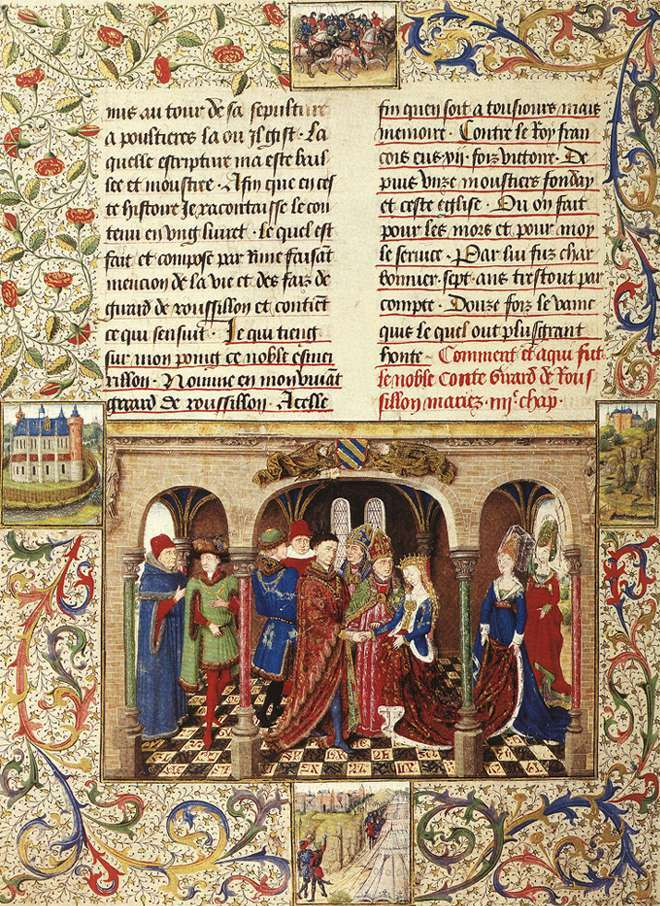
Master of Girart de Roussillon, c. 1450, Burgundian wedding (Philip the Good and Isabella of Portugal). Austrian National Library, Vienna

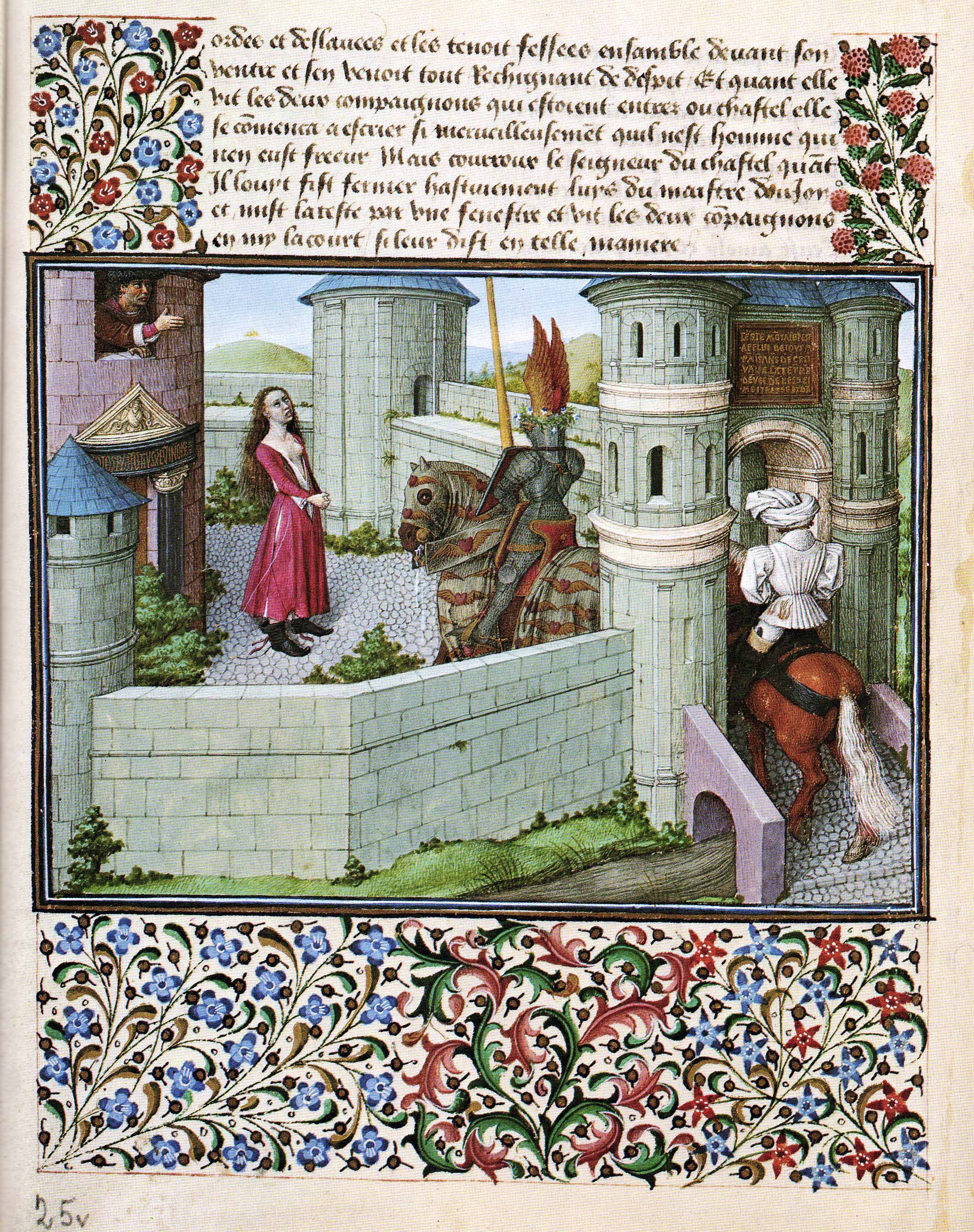
Barthélemy d'Eyck's chivalrous and romantic leaf from his "Livre du cœur d'Amour épris", c. 1458–1460

Before the mid-15th century, illuminated books were considered a higher form of art than panel painting, and their ornate and luxurious qualities better reflected the wealth, status and taste of their owners. Manuscripts were ideally suited as diplomatic gifts or offerings to commemorate dynastic marriages or other major courtly occasions. From the 12th century, specialist monastery-based workshops (in French libraires) produced books of hours (collections of prayers to be said at canonical hours), psalters, prayer books and histories, as well as romance and poetry books. At the start of the 15th century, Gothic manuscripts from Paris dominated the northern European market. Their popularity was in part due to the production of more affordable, single leaf miniatures which could be inserted into unillustrated books of hours. These were at times offered in a serial manner designed to encourage patrons to "include as many pictures as they could afford", which clearly presented them as an item of fashion but also as a form of indulgence. The single leaves had other uses rather than inserts; they could be attached to walls as aids to private meditation and prayer, as seen in Christus' 1450–1460 panel Portrait of a Young Man, now in the National Gallery, which shows a small leaf with text to the Vera icon illustrated with the head of Christ. The French artists were overtaken in importance from the mid-15th century by masters in Ghent, Bruges and Utrecht. English production, once of the highest quality, had greatly declined and relatively few Italian manuscripts went north of the Alps. The French masters did not give up their position easily however, and even in 1463 were urging their guilds to impose sanctions on the Netherlandish artists.

The Limbourg brothers' ornate Très Riches Heures du Duc de Berry perhaps marks both the beginning and a highpoint of Netherlandish illumination. Later the Master of the Legend of Saint Lucy explored the same mix of illusionism and realism. The Limbourgs' career ended just as van Eyck's began – by 1416 all the brothers (none of whom had reached 30) and their patron Jean, Duke of Berry were dead, most likely from plague. Van Eyck is thought to have contributed several of the more acclaimed miniatures of the Turin-Milan Hours as the anonymous artist known as Hand G. A number of illustrations from the period show a strong stylistic resemblance to Gerard David, though it is unclear whether they are from his hands or those of followers.

A number of factors led to the popularity of Netherlandish illuminators. Primary was the tradition and expertise that developed in the region in the centuries following the monastic reform of the 14th century, building on the growth in number and prominence of monasteries, abbeys and churches from the 12th century that had already produced significant numbers of liturgical texts. There was a strong political aspect; the form had many influential patrons such as Jean, Duke of Berry and Philip the Good, the latter of whom collected more than a thousand illuminated books before his death. According to Thomas Kren, Philip's "library was an expression of the man as a Christian prince, and an embodiment of the state – his politics and authority, his learning and piety". Because of his patronage the manuscript industry in the Lowlands grew so that it dominated Europe for several generations. The Burgundian book-collecting tradition passed to Philip's son and his wife, Charles the Bold and Margaret of York; his granddaughter Mary of Burgundy and her husband Maximilian I; and to his son-in-law, Edward IV, who was an avid collector of Flemish manuscripts. The libraries left by Philip and Edward IV formed the nucleus from which sprang the Royal Library of Belgium and the English Royal Library.

Netherlandish illuminators had an important export market, designing many works specifically for the English market. Following a decline in domestic patronage after Charles the Bold died in 1477, the export market became more important. Illuminators responded to differences in taste by producing more lavish and extravagantly decorated works tailored for foreign elites, including Edward IV of England, James IV of Scotland and Eleanor of Viseu.

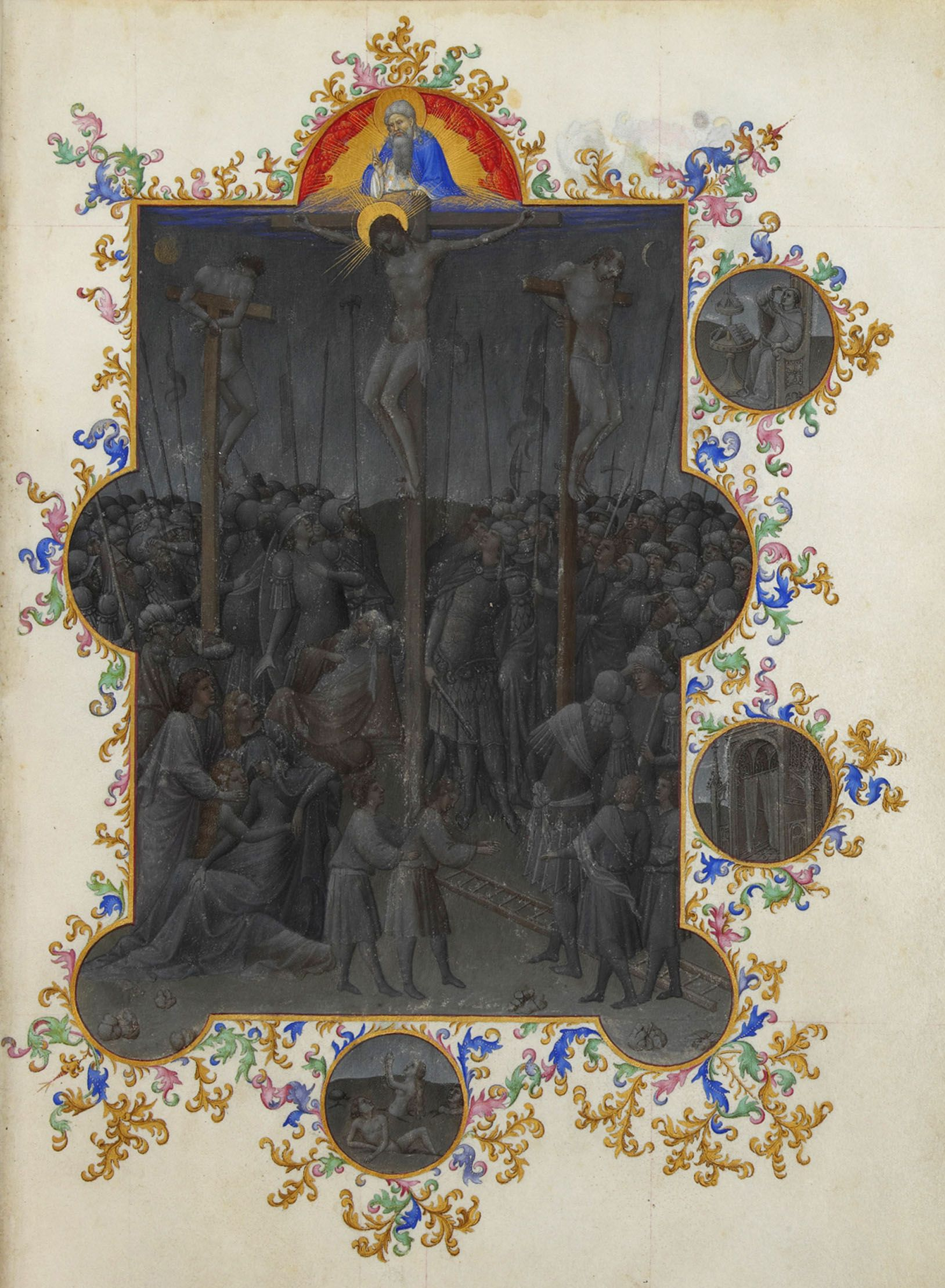
Limbourg brothers, The Death of Christ, folio 153r, Très Riches Heures du Duc de Berry

There was considerable overlap between panel painting and illumination; van Eyck, van der Weyden, Christus and other painters designed manuscript miniatures. In addition, miniaturists would borrow motifs and ideas from panel paintings; Campin's work was often used as a source in this way, for example in the "Hours of Raoul d'Ailly". Commissions were often shared between several masters, with junior painters or specialists assisting, especially with details such as the border decorations, these last often done by women. The masters rarely signed their work, making attribution difficult; the identities of some of the more significant illuminators are lost.

Netherlandish artists found increasingly inventive ways to highlight and differentiate their work from manuscripts from surrounding countries; such techniques included designing elaborate page borders and devising ways to relate scale and space. They explored the interplay between the three essential components of a manuscript: border, miniature and text. An example is the Nassau book of hours (c. 1467–80) by the Vienna Master of Mary of Burgundy, in which the borders are decorated with large illusionistic flowers and insects. These elements achieved their effect by being broadly painted, as if scattered across the gilded surface of the miniatures. This technique was continued by, among others, the Flemish Master of James IV of Scotland (possibly Gerard Horenbout), known for his innovative page layout. Using various illusionistic elements, he often blurred the line between the miniature and its border, frequently using both in his efforts to advance the narrative of his scenes.

During the early 19th century, the collection of 15th- and 16th-century Netherlandish cut-out, as miniatures or parts for albums, became fashionable amongst connoisseurs such as William Young Ottley, leading to the destruction of many manuscripts. Originals were highly sought after, a revival that helped the rediscovery of Netherlandish art in the later part of the century.

=== Tapestry ===
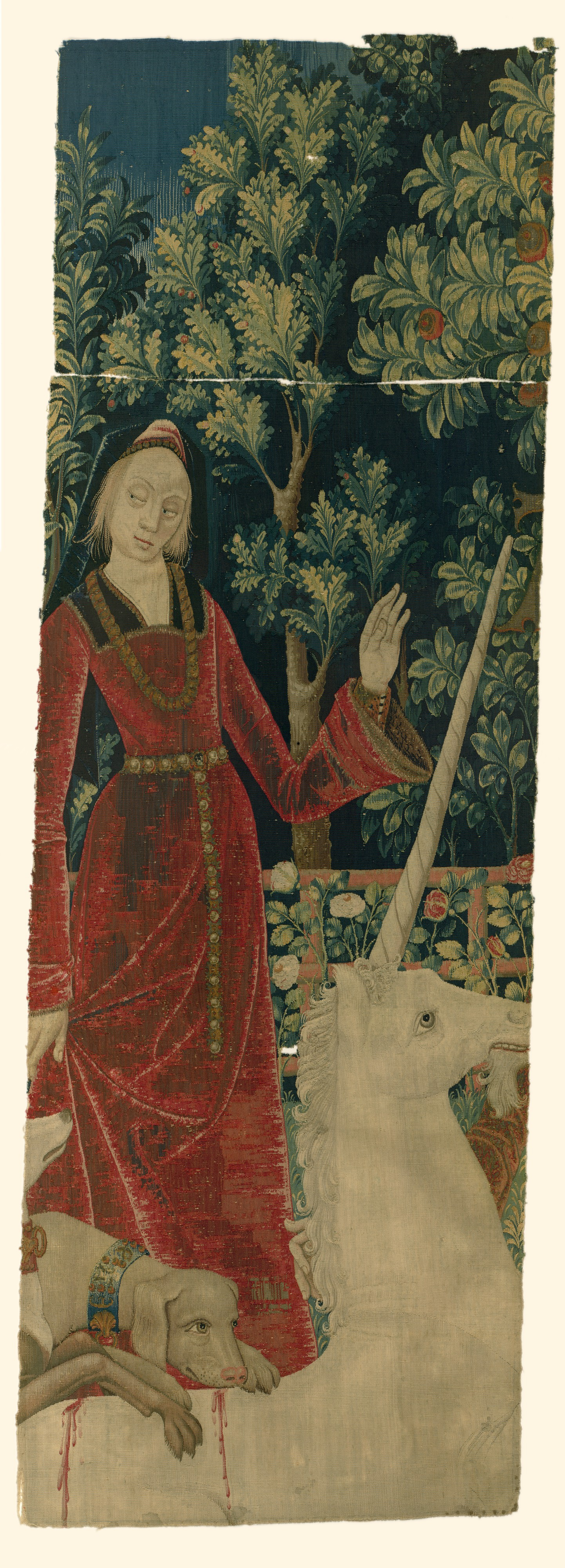
"The Mystic Capture of the Unicorn", fragment from The Hunt of the Unicorn, 1495–1505. The Cloisters, New York

During the mid-15th century, tapestry was one of the most expensive and prized artistic products in Europe. Commercial production proliferated across the Netherlands and northern France from the early 15th century, especially in the cities of Arras, Bruges and Tournai. The perceived technical ability of these artisans was such that, in 1517, Pope Leo X sent Raphael's cartoons to Brussels to be woven into hangings. Such woven wall hangings played a central political role as diplomatic gifts, especially in their larger format; Philip the Good gifted several to participants at the Congress of Arras in 1435, where the halls were draped from top to bottom and all around (tout autour) with tapestries showing scenes of the "Battle and Overthrow of People of Liege". At Charles the Bold and Margaret of York's wedding the room "was hung above with draperies of wool, blue and white, and on the sides was tapestried with a rich tapestry woven with the history of Jason and the Golden Fleece". Rooms typically were hung from ceiling to floor with tapestries and some rooms named for a set of tapestries, such as a chamber Philip the Bold named for a set of white tapestries with scenes from The Romance of the Rose. For about two centuries during the Burgundian period, master weavers produced "innumerable series of hangings heavy with gold and silver thread, the like of which the world had never seen".

The practical use of textiles results from their portability; tapestries provided easily assembled interior decorations suited to religious or civic ceremonies. Their value is reflected in their positioning in contemporary inventories, in which they are typically found at the top of the record, then ranked in accordance with their material or colouring. White and gold were considered of the highest quality. Charles V of France had 57 tapestries, of which 16 were white. Jean de Berry owned 19, while Mary of Burgundy, Isabella of Valois, Isabeau of Bavaria and Philip the Good all held substantial collections.

Tapestry production began with design. The designs, or cartoons were typically executed on paper or parchment, put together by qualified painters, then sent to weavers, often across a great distance. Because cartoons could be re-used, craftsmen often worked on source material that was decades old. As both paper and parchment are highly perishable, few of the original cartoons survive. Once a design was agreed upon its production might be farmed out among many weavers. Looms were active in all the major Flemish cities, in most of the towns and in many of the villages.

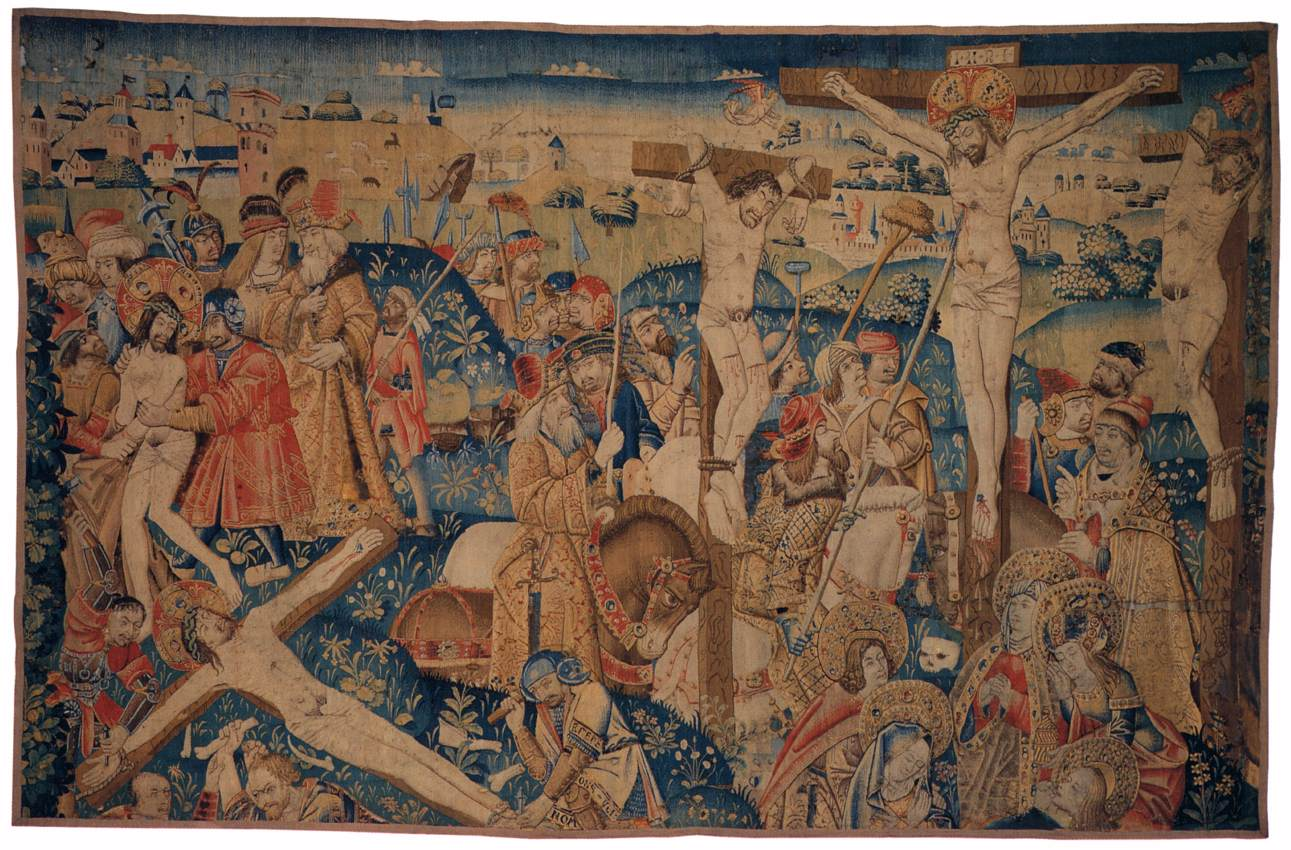
Unknown Flemish weaver, Tapestry with Scenes from the Passion of Christ, c. 1470–90. Rijksmuseum, Amsterdam

Looms were not controlled by the guilds. Dependent on a migrant workforce, their commercial activity was driven by entrepreneurs, who were usually painters. The entrepreneur would locate and commission patrons, hold a stock of cartoons and provide raw materials such as wool, silk, and sometimes gold and silver – which often had to be imported. Entrepreneurs were in direct contact with the patron, and often went through the nuances of the design at both the cartoon and final stages. This examination was often a difficult business and necessitated delicate management; in 1400 Isabeau of Bavaria rejected a completed set by Colart de Laon having earlier approved the designs, to de Laon's – and presumably his commissioner's – considerable embarrassment.

Because tapestries were designed largely by painters, their formal conventions are closely aligned with the conventions of panel painting. This is especially true with the later generations of 16th-century painters who produced panoramas of heaven and hell. Harbison describes how the intricate, dense and overlaid detail of Bosch's Garden of Earthly Delights resembles, "in its precise symbolism ... a medieval tapestry".

=== Triptychs and altarpieces ===
Northern triptychs (Note: The word triptych did not exist during the era; the works were known as "paintings with doors". See Jacobs (2011), 8) and polyptychs were popular across Europe from the late 14th century, with the peak of demand lasting until the early 16th century. During the 15th century, they were the most widely produced format of northern panel painting. Preoccupied with religious subject matter, they come in two broad types: smaller, portable private devotional works, or larger altarpieces for liturgical settings. The earliest northern examples are compound works incorporating engraving and painting, usually with two painted wings that could be folded over a carved central corpus. (Note: In 14th-century altarpieces the "nature of the subject" was most important; generally the more sacred the subject the more decorative and elaborate its treatment. See Huizinga (2009), 22)

Rogier van der Weyden, Braque Triptych, c. 1452. Oil on oak panels. Louvre, Paris. This triptych is noted for the floating "speech" inscriptions and the continuous landscape uniting the panels.

Polyptychs were produced by the more accomplished masters. They provide greater scope for variation, and a greater number of possible combinations of interior and exterior panels that could be viewed at one time. That hinged works could be opened and closed served a practical purpose; on religious holidays the more prosaic and everyday outer panels were replaced by the lush interior panels. The Ghent Altarpiece, completed in 1432, had different configurations for weekdays, Sundays and church holidays. (Note: The work comprises 12 exterior and 14 interior painted panels, and the different possible combinations of panels produced different intended meanings. See Toman (2011), 319)

The first generation of Netherlandish masters borrowed many customs from 13th- and 14th-century Italian altarpieces. The conventions for Italian triptychs before 1400 were quite rigid. In central panels the mid-ground was populated by members of the Holy Family; early works, especially from the Sienese or Florentine traditions, were overwhelmingly characterised by images of the enthroned Virgin set against a gilded background. The wings usually contain a variety of angels, donors and saints, but there is never direct eye contact, and only rarely a narrative connection, with the central panel's figures.

Netherlandish painters adapted many of these conventions, but subverted them almost from the start. Van der Weyden was especially innovative, as apparent in his 1442–1445 Miraflores Altarpiece and c. 1452 Braque Triptych. In these paintings members of the Holy Family appear on the wings instead of just the central panels, while the latter is notable for the continuous landscape connecting the three inner panels. From the 1490s Hieronymus Bosch painted at least 16 triptychs, (Note: Of which three are documented but lost, eight survive fully intact, and five exist in fragments. See Jacobs (2000), 1010) the best of which subverted existing conventions. Bosch's work continued the move towards secularism and emphasised landscape. Bosch also unified the scenes of the inner panels.

Hieronymus Bosch, The Hermit Saints, c. 1493. Doge's Palace, Venice

Triptychs were commissioned by German patrons from the 1380s, with large-scale export beginning around 1400. Few of these very early examples survive, but the demand for Netherlandish altarpieces throughout Europe is evident from the many surviving examples still extant in churches across the continent. Till-Holger Borchert describes how they bestowed a "prestige which, in the first half of the 15th century, only the workshops of the Burgundian Netherlands were capable of achieving". By the 1390s, Netherlandish altarpieces were produced mostly in Brussels and Bruges. The popularity of Brussels' altarpieces lasted until about 1530, when the output of the Antwerp workshops grew in favour. This was in part because they produced at a lower cost, allocating different portions of the panels among specialised workshop members, a practice Borchert describes as an early form of division of labour.

Multi-panel Netherlandish paintings fell out of favour and were considered old-fashioned as Antwerp Mannerism came to the fore in the mid-16th century. Later the iconoclasm of the Reformation deemed them offensive, and many works in the Low Countries were destroyed. Extant examples are found mostly in German churches and monasteries. As secular works grew in demand, triptychs were often broken up and sold as individual works, especially if a panel or section contained an image that could pass as a secular portrait. A panel would sometimes be cut down to only the figure, with the background over-painted so that "it looked sufficiently like a genre piece to hang in a well-known collection of Dutch 17th-century paintings".

=== Diptychs ===
Diptychs were widely popular in northern Europe from the mid-15th to the early 16th century. They consisted of two equally sized panels joined by hinges (or, less often, a fixed frame); the panels were usually linked thematically. Hinged panels could be opened and closed like a book, allowing both an interior and exterior view, while the ability to close the wings allowed protection of the inner images. Originating from conventions in Books of Hours, diptychs typically functioned as less expensive and more portable altarpieces. Diptychs are distinct from pendants in that they are physically connected wings and not merely two paintings hung side by side. They were usually near-miniature in scale, and some emulated medieval "treasury art" -small pieces made of gold or ivory. The tracery seen in works such as van der Weyden's Virgin and Child reflects ivory carving of the period. The format was adapted by van Eyck and van der Weyden on commission from members of the House of Valois-Burgundy, and refined by Hugo van der Goes, Hans Memling and later Jan van Scorel.

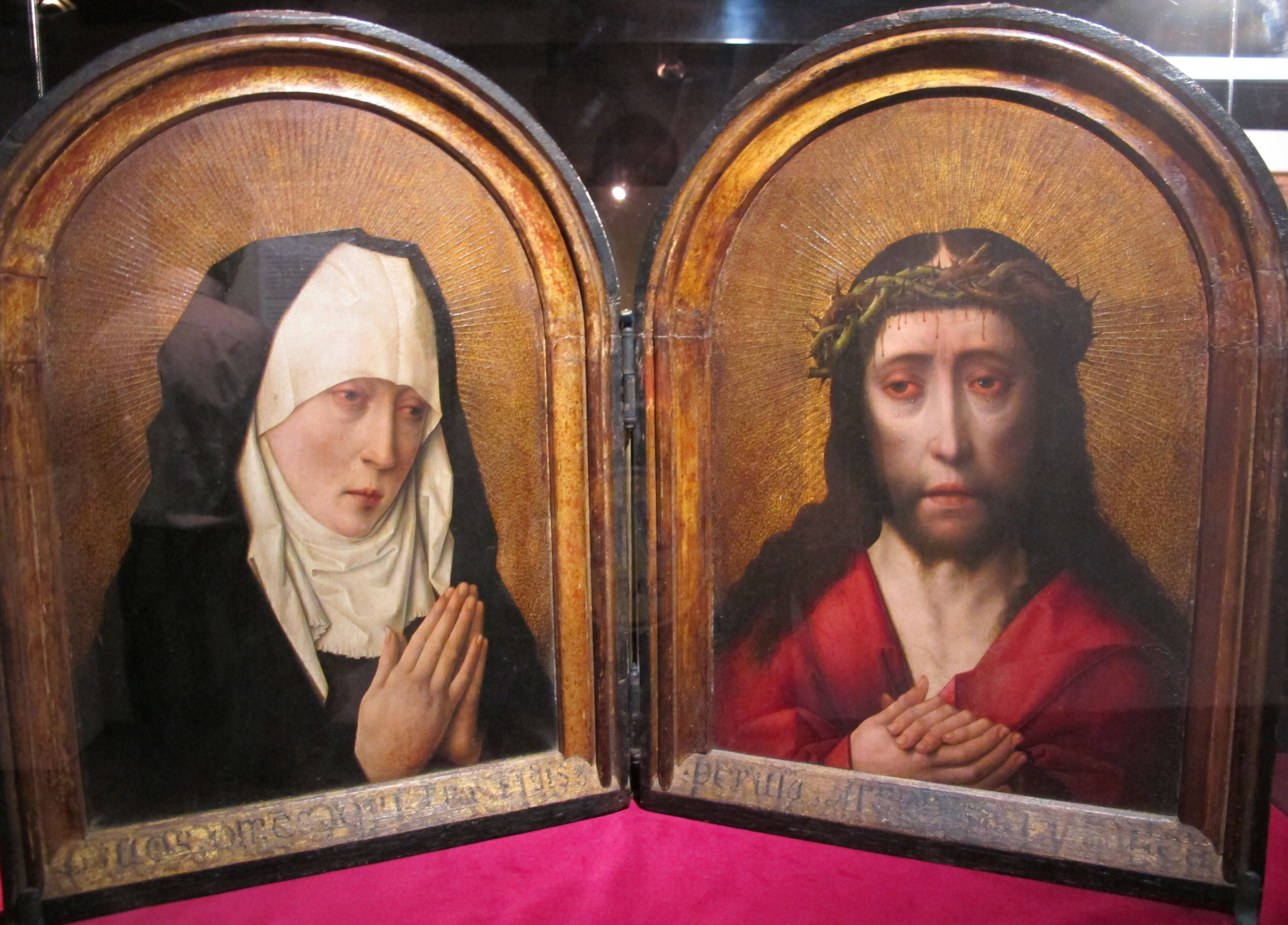
Dieric Bouts, Mater Dolorosa/Ecce Homo, after 1450, a rare surviving diptych with intact frame and hinges

Netherlandish diptychs tend to illustrate only a small range of religious scenes. There are numerous depictions of the Virgin and Child, reflecting the Virgin's contemporary popularity as a subject of devotion. The inner panels consisted mainly of donor portraits – often of husbands and their wives – alongside saints or the Virgin and Child. The donor was nearly always shown kneeling in full or half length, with hands clasped in prayer. The Virgin and Child are always positioned on the right, reflecting the Christian reverence for the right hand side as the "place of honour" alongside the divine.

Their development and commercial worth has been linked to a change in religious attitude during the 14th century, when a more meditative and solitary devotion – exemplified by the Devotio Moderna movement – grew in popularity. Private reflection and prayer was encouraged and the small-scale diptych fitted this purpose. It became popular among the newly emerging middle class and the more affluent monasteries across the Low Countries and northern Germany. Ainsworth says that regardless of size, whether a large altarpiece or a small diptych, Netherlandish painting is a "matter of small scale and meticulous detail". The small size was meant to entice the viewer into a meditative state for personal devotion and perhaps the "experience of miraculous visions".

Late 20th-century technical examination has shown significant differences in technique and style between the panels of individual diptychs. The technical inconsistencies may be the result of the workshop system, in which the more prosaic passages were often completed by assistants. A change in style between panels can be seen, according to historian John Hand, because the divine panel was usually based on general designs sold on the open market, with the donor panel added after a patron was found.

Few intact diptychs survive. As with altarpieces, the majority were later separated and sold as single "genre" pictures. In the workshop system some were interchangeable, and the religious works may have been paired with newly commissioned donor panels. Later many diptychs were broken apart, thus creating two saleable works from one. During the Reformation, religious scenes were often removed.

=== Portraiture ===
Secular portraiture was a rarity in European art before 1430. The format did not exist as a separate genre and was only found infrequently at the highest end of the market in betrothal portraits or royal family commissions. While such undertakings may have been profitable, they were considered a lower art form and the majority of surviving pre-16th-century examples are unattributed.

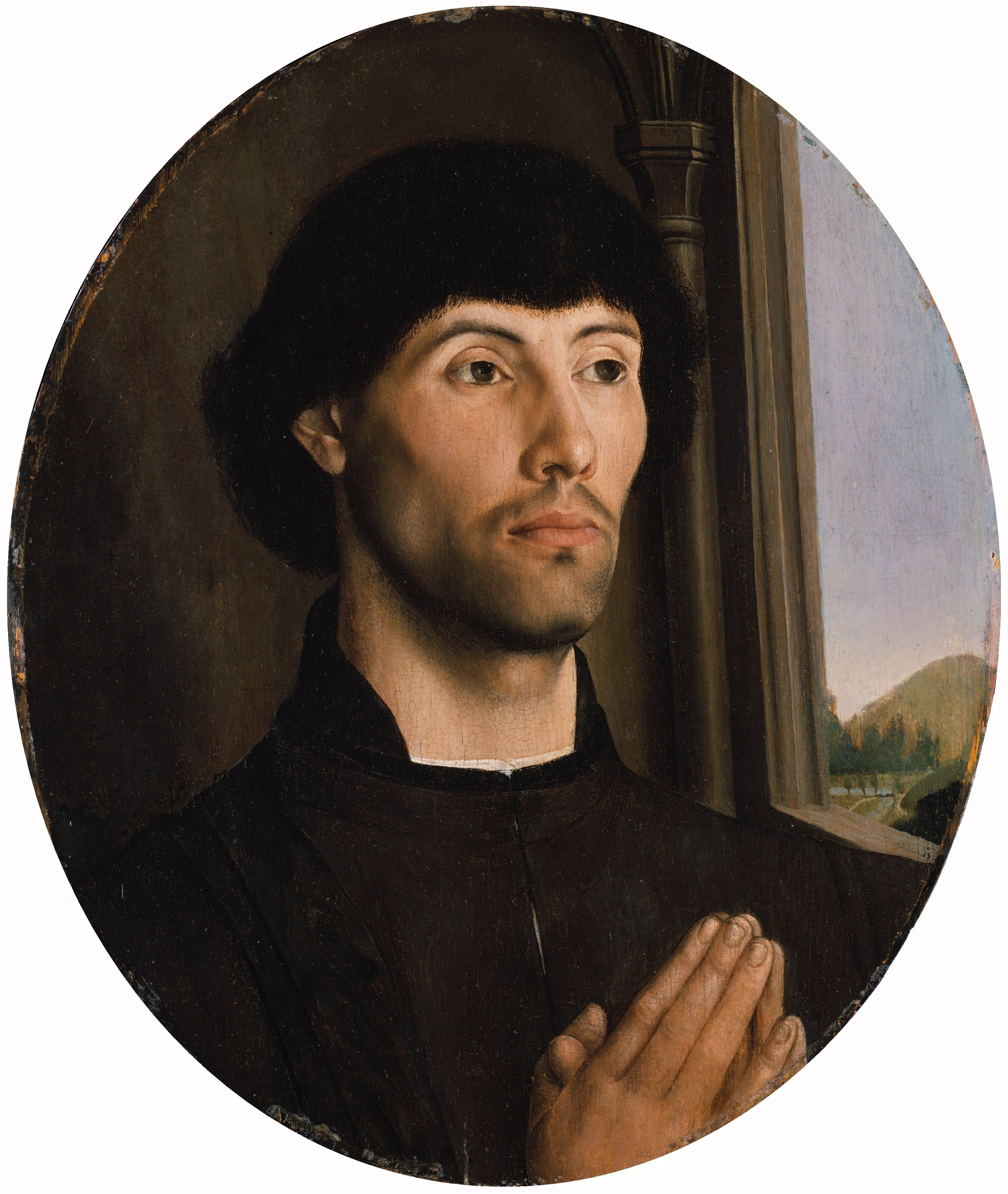
Hugo van der Goes, Portrait of a Man, c. 1480. Metropolitan Museum of Art, New York

Large numbers of single devotional panels showing saints and biblical figures were being produced, but depictions of historical, known individuals did not begin until the early 1430s. Van Eyck was the pioneer; his seminal 1432 Léal Souvenir is one of the earliest surviving examples, emblematic of the new style in its realism and acute observation of the small details of the sitter's appearance. His Arnolfini Portrait is filled with symbolism, as is the Madonna of Chancellor Rolin, commissioned as testament to Rolin's power, influence, and piety.

Van der Weyden developed the conventions of northern portraiture and was hugely influential on the following generations of painters. Rather than merely follow van Eyck's meticulous attention to detail, van der Weyden created more abstract and sensual representations. He was highly sought after as a portraitist, yet there are noticeable similarities in his portraits, likely because he used and reused the same underdrawings, which met common ideals of rank and piety. These were then adapted to show the facial characteristics and expressions of the particular sitter.

Petrus Christus placed his sitter in a naturalistic setting rather than a flat and featureless background. This approach was in part a reaction against van der Weyden, who, in his emphasis on sculptural figures, utilised very shallow pictorial spaces.

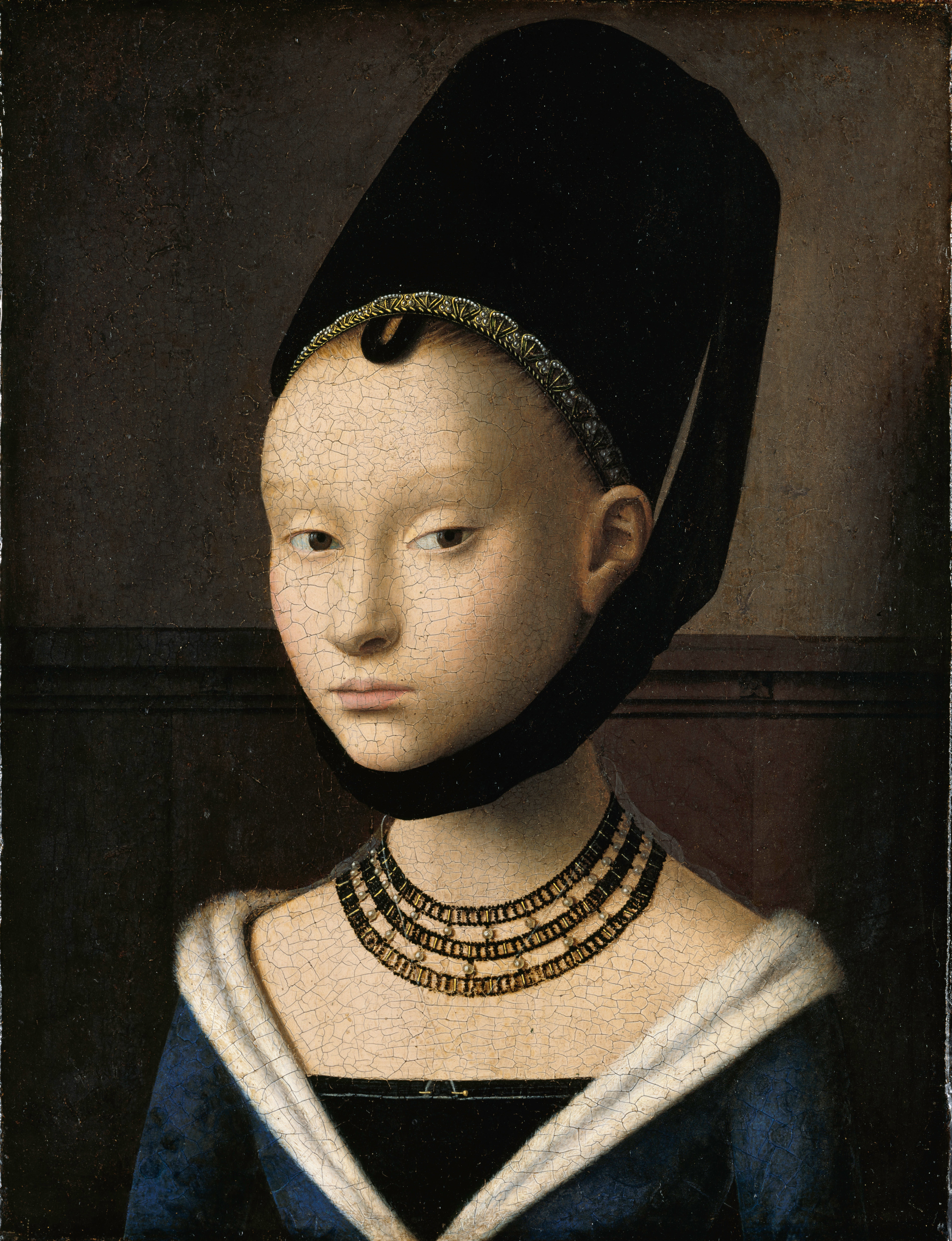
Petrus Christus, Portrait of a Young Girl, after 1460, Gemäldegalerie, Berlin. One of the first portraits to present its sitter in a three-dimensional room. Many sources mention her enigmatic and complex expression, and petulant, reserved gaze.

In his 1462 Portrait of a Man, Dieric Bouts went further by situating the man in a room complete with a window that looks out at a landscape, while in the 16th century, the full-length portrait became popular in the north. The latter format was practically unseen in earlier northern art, although it had a tradition in Italy going back centuries, most usually in fresco and illuminated manuscripts. Full-length portraits were reserved for depictions of the highest echelon of society, and were associated with princely displays of power. Of the second generation of northern painters, Hans Memling became the leading portraitist, taking commissions from as far as Italy. He was highly influential on later painters and is credited with inspiring Leonardo's positioning of the Mona Lisa in front of a landscape view. Van Eyck and van der Weyden similarly influenced the French artist Jean Fouquet and the Germans Hans Pleydenwurff and Martin Schongauer among others.

The Netherlandish artists moved away from the profile view – popularised during the Italian Quattrocento – towards the less formal but more engaging three-quarter view. At this angle, more than one side of the face is visible as the sitter's body is rotated towards the viewer. This pose gives a better view of the shape and features of the head and allows the sitter to look out towards the viewer. The gaze of the sitter rarely engages the viewer. Van Eyck's 1433 Portrait of a Man is an early example, which shows the artist himself looking at the viewer. Although there is often direct eye contact between subject and viewer, the look is normally detached, aloof and uncommunicative, perhaps to reflect the subject's high social position. There are exceptions, typically in bridal portraits or in the case of potential betrothals, when the object of the work is to make the sitter as attractive as possible. In these cases the sitter was often shown smiling, with an engaging and radiant expression designed to appeal to her intended.

Around 1508, Albrecht Dürer described the function of portraiture as "preserving a person's appearance after his death". (Note: Dürer's father, a goldsmith, spent time as a journeyman in the Netherlands and met with, according to his son, "the great artists". Dürer himself travelled there between 1520 and 1521 and visited Bruges, Ghent and Brussels among other places. See Borchert (2011), 83) Portraits were objects of status, and served to ensure that the individual's personal success was recorded and would endure beyond his lifetime. Most portraits tended to show royalty, the upper nobility or princes of the church. The new affluence in the Burgundian Netherlands brought a wider variety of clientele, as members of the upper middle class could now afford to commission a portrait. As a result, more is known about the appearance and dress of the region's people than at any time since the late Roman period. Portraits did not generally require lengthy sittings; typically a series of preparatory drawings were used to flesh out the final panel. Very few of these drawings survive, a notable exception being van Eyck's study for his Portrait of Cardinal Niccolò Albergati.

=== Landscape ===
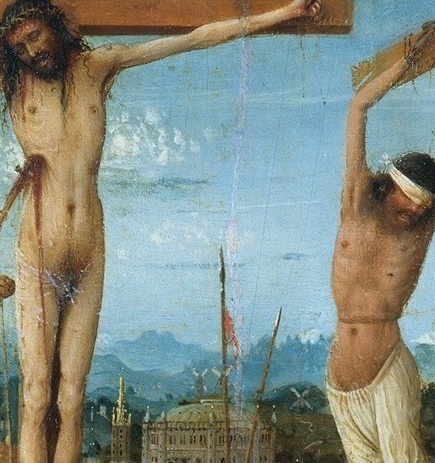
Detail from Jan van Eyck's Crucifixion and Last Judgement diptych. Christ and thief before a view of Jerusalem, c. 1430. Metropolitan Museum of Art, New York. The Crucifixion panel in this diptych is framed within an azure sky against a distant view of Jerusalem.

Landscape was a secondary concern to Netherlandish painters before the mid 1460s. Geographical settings were rare and when they did appear usually consisted of glimpses through open windows or arcades. They were rarely based on actual locations; (Note: Konrad Witz's Miraculous Draft of Fishes of 1444 is credited as the earliest extant faithful portrayal in European art history of a landscape based on observation of real topographical features. See Borchert (2011), 58) the settings tended to be largely imagined, designed to suit the thematic thrust of the panel. Because most of the works were donor portraits, very often the landscapes were tame, controlled and served merely to provide a harmonious setting for the idealised interior space. In this, the northern artists lagged behind their Italian counterparts who were already placing their sitters within geographically identifiable and closely described landscapes. Some of the northern landscapes are highly detailed and notable in their own right, including van Eyck's unsentimental c. 1430 Crucifixion and Last Judgement diptych and van der Weyden's widely copied 1435–1440 Saint Luke Drawing the Virgin.

Van Eyck was almost certainly influenced by the Labours of the Months landscapes the Limbourg brothers painted for the Très Riches Heures du Duc de Berry. The influence can be seen in the illuminations painted in the Turin-Milan Hours, which show rich landscapes in the tiny bas de page scenes. These, according to Pächt, should be defined as early examples of Netherlandish landscape painting. The landscape tradition in illuminated manuscripts would continue for at least the next century. Simon Bening "explored new territory in the genre of landscape", seen in several of the leaves he painted for the c. 1520 Grimani Breviary.

From the late 15th century, a number of painters emphasised landscape in their works, a development led in part by the shift in preference from religious iconography to secular subjects. Second-generation Netherlandish painters applied the mid-14th-century dictum of natural representation. This was born of the rising affluence of the region's middle class, many of whom had now travelled south and seen countryside noticeably different from their flat homeland. At the same time, the later part of the century saw the emergence of specialisation and a number of masters focused on detailing landscape, most notably Konrad Witz in the mid-15th century, and later Joachim Patinir. Most innovations in this format came from artists living in the Dutch regions of the Burgundian lands, most notably from Haarlem, Leiden and 's-Hertogenbosch. The significant artists from these areas did not slavishly reproduce the scenery before them, but in subtle ways adapted and modified their landscapes to reinforce the emphasis and meaning of the panel they were working on.

Patinir developed what is now called the world landscape genre, which is typified by biblical or historical figures within an imagined panoramic landscape, usually mountains and lowlands, water and buildings. Paintings of this type are characterised by an elevated viewpoint, with the figures dwarfed by their surroundings. The format was taken up by, among others, Gerard David and Pieter Bruegel the Elder, and became popular in Germany, especially with painters from the Danube school. Patinir's works are relatively small and use a horizontal format; this was to become so standard for landscapes in art that it is now called "landscape" format in ordinary contexts, but at the time it was a considerable novelty, as the vast majority of panel paintings before 1520 were vertical in format. World landscape paintings retain many of the elements developed from the mid-15th century, but are composed, in modern cinematic terms, as a long rather than a medium shot. The human presence remained central rather than serving as mere staffage. Hieronymus Bosch adapted elements of the world landscape style, with the influence especially notable in his single-panel paintings.

The most popular subjects of this type include the Flight into Egypt and the plight of hermits such as Saints Jerome and Anthony. As well as connecting the style to the later Age of Discovery, the role of Antwerp as a booming centre both of world trade and cartography, and the wealthy town-dweller's view of the countryside, art historians have explored the paintings as religious metaphors for the pilgrimage of life.

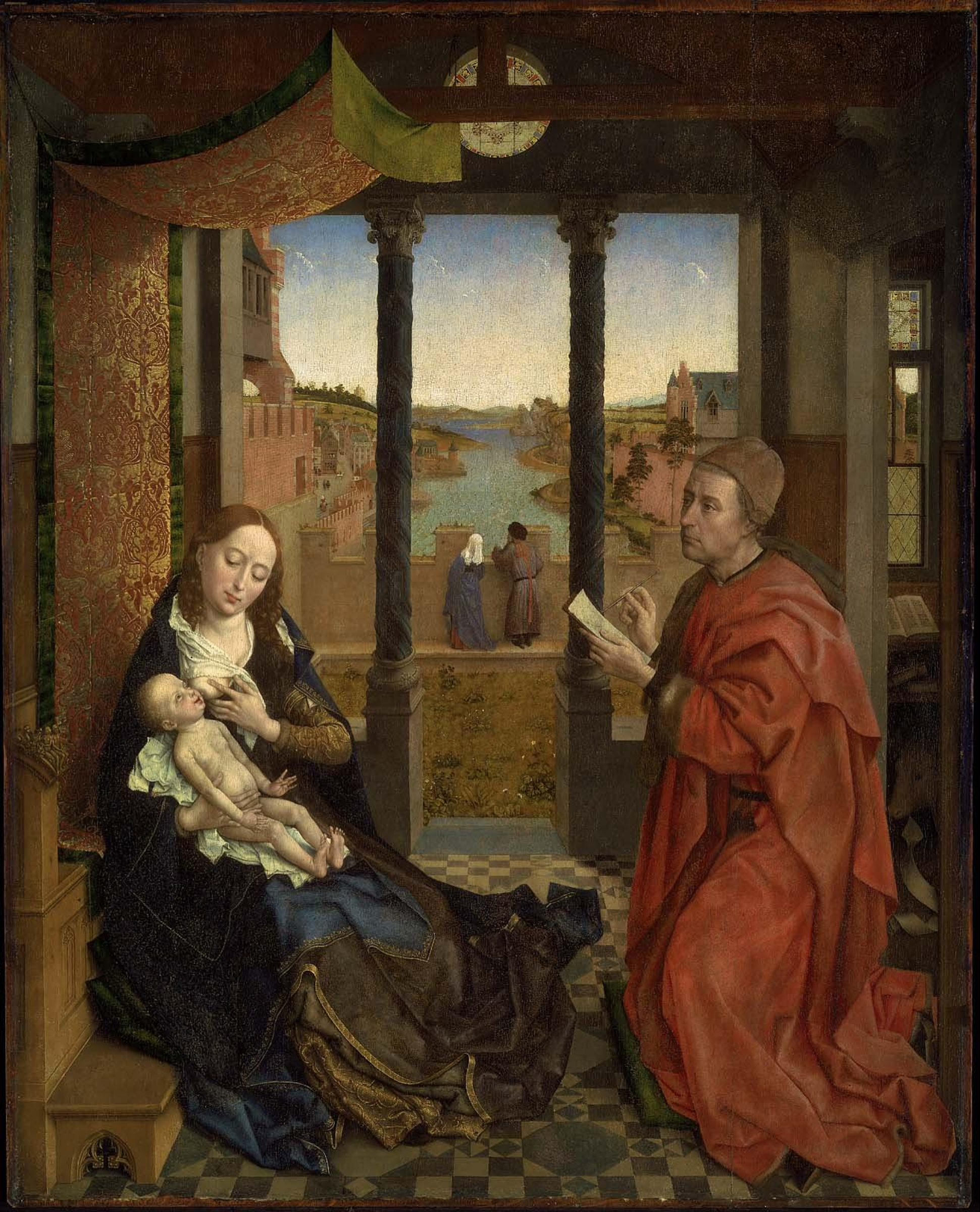
Rogier van der Weyden, Saint Luke Drawing the Virgin, c. 1435–1440. Museum of Fine Arts, Boston

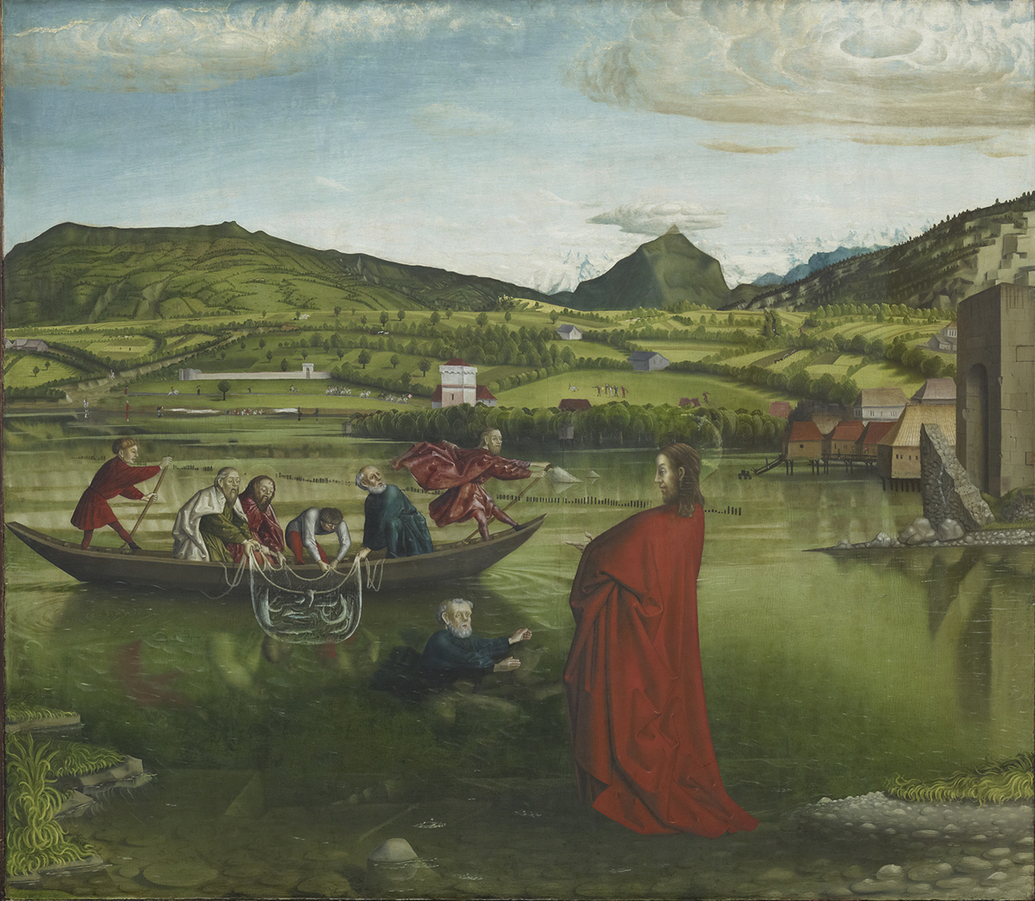
Konrad Witz, The Miraculous Draft of Fishes, 1444. Museum of Art and History, Geneva

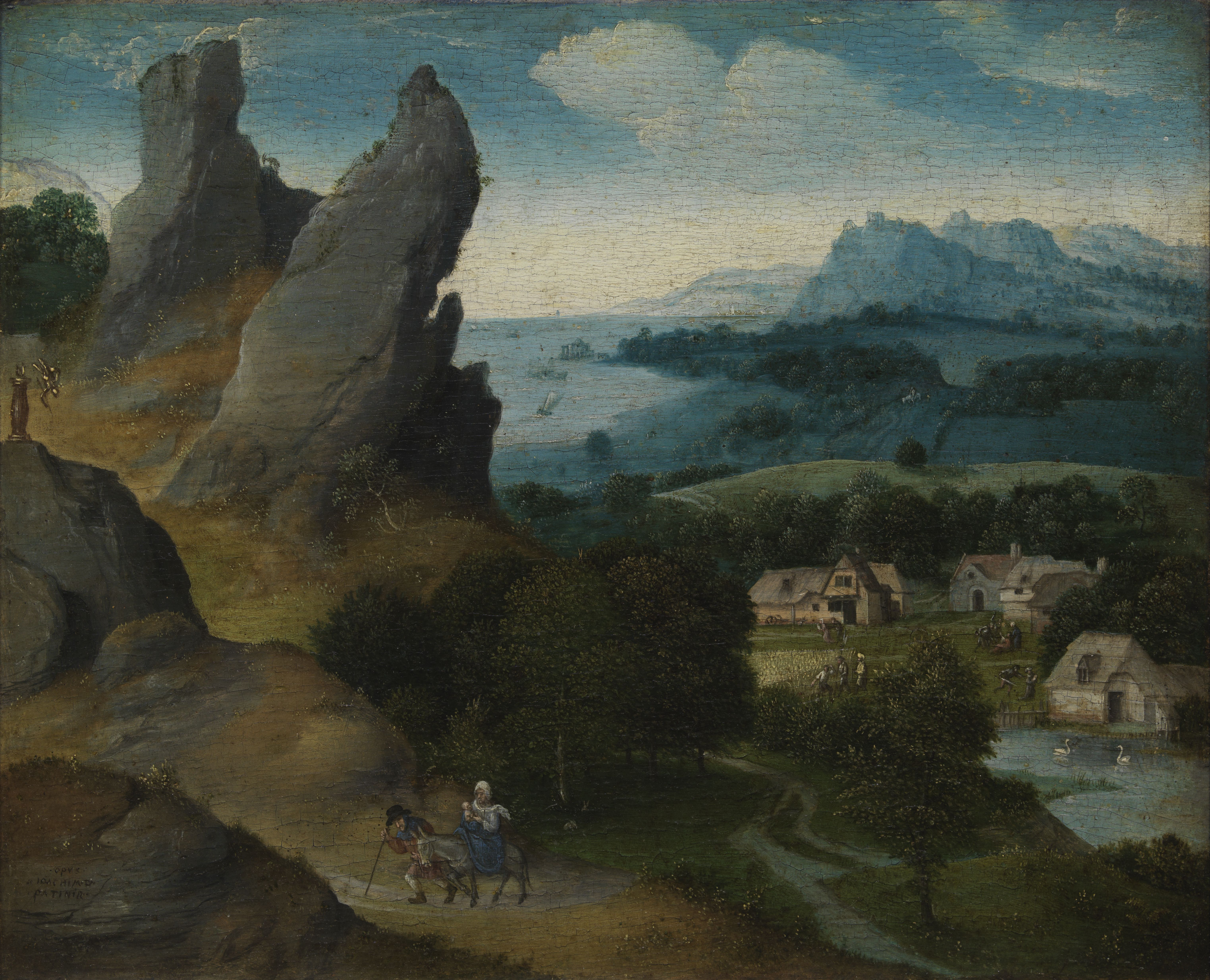
Joachim Patinir, Landscape with the Flight into Egypt, late 15th century. Royal Museum of Fine Arts Antwerp

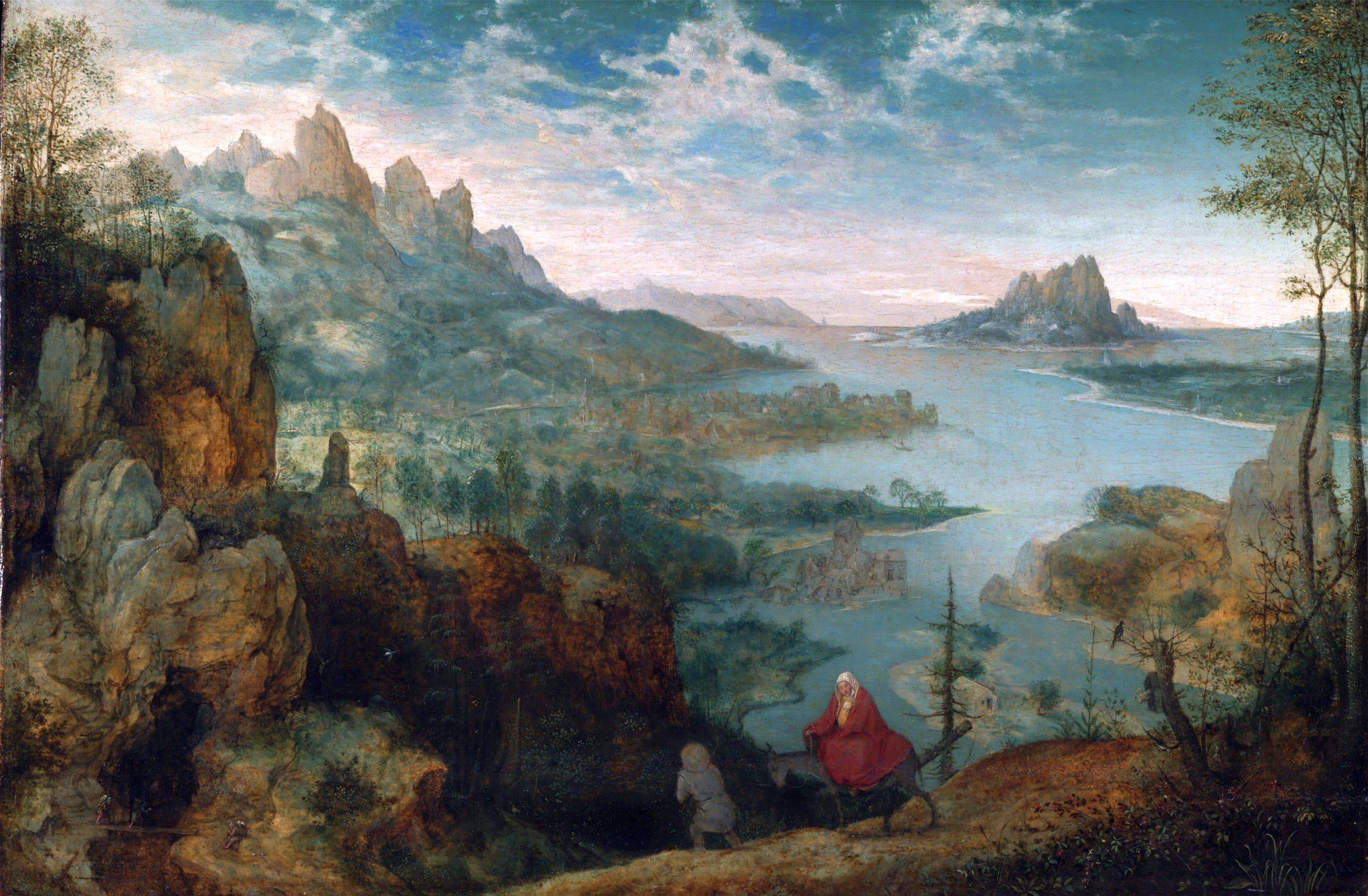
Pieter Bruegel the Elder, Landscape with the Flight into Egypt, 1563. Courtauld Gallery, London

== Relationship to the Italian Renaissance ==
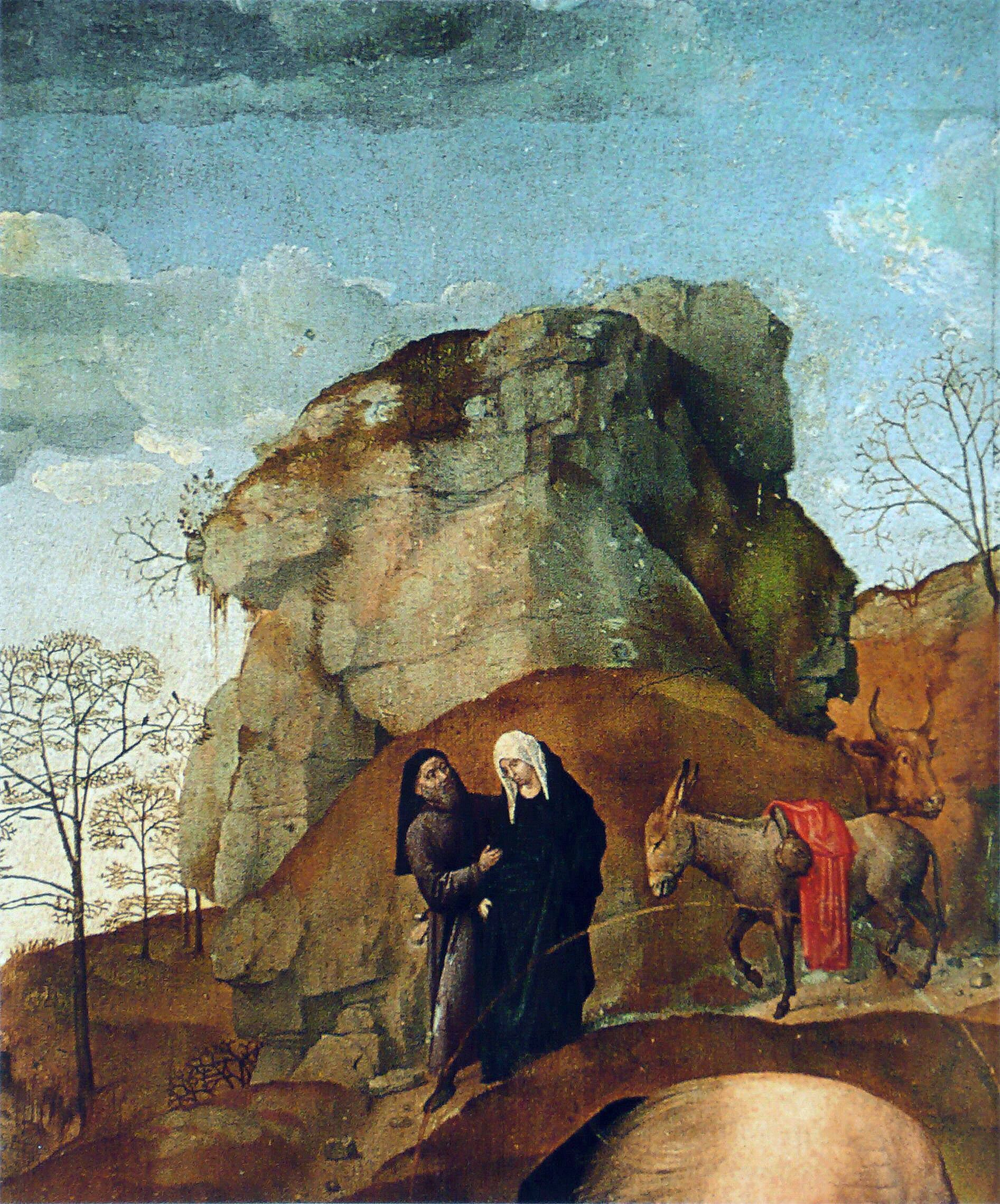
Hugo van der Goes, detail from the Portinari Altarpiece, c. 1475. Uffizi, Florence

The progressions in northern art developed almost simultaneously with the early Italian Renaissance. The philosophical and artistic traditions of the Mediterranean were not however part of the northern heritage, to the extent that many elements of Latin culture were actively disparaged in the north. The role of Renaissance humanism in art, for example, was less pronounced in the Low Countries than in Italy. Local religious trends had a strong influence on early northern art, as can be seen in the subject matter, composition and form of many late 13th- and early 14th-century artworks. The northern painters' doctrine was also built on elements of recent Gothic tradition, and less on the classical tradition prevalent in Italy.

While devotional paintings – especially altarpieces – remained dominant in Early Netherlandish art, secular portraiture became increasingly common in both northern and southern Europe as artists freed themselves from the prevailing idea that portraiture should be restricted to saints and other religious figures. In Italy this development was tied to the ideals of humanism.

Italian influences on Netherlandish art are first apparent in the late 15th century, when some of the painters began to travel south. This also explains why a number of later Netherlandish artists became associated with, in the words of art historian Rolf Toman, "picturesque gables, bloated, barrel-shaped columns, droll cartouches, 'twisted' figures, and stunningly unrealistic colours – actually employ[ing] the visual language of Mannerism". Wealthy northern merchants could afford to buy paintings from the top tier of artists. As a result, painters became increasingly aware of their status in society: they signed their works more often, painted portraits of themselves, and became well-known figures because of their artistic activities.

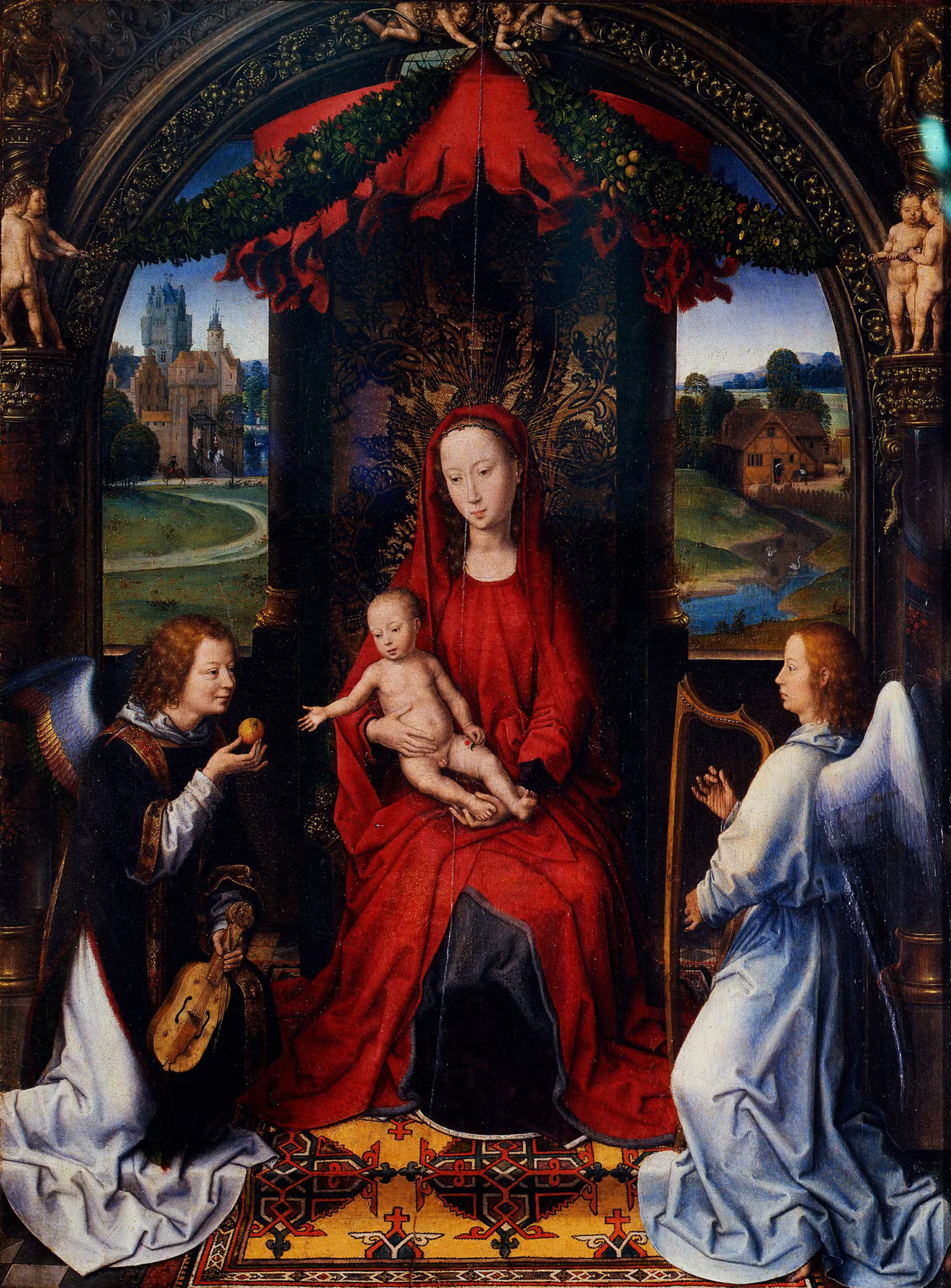
Hans Memling, Virgin and Child with Two Angels, c. 1480. Uffizi, Florence

The northern masters were greatly admired in Italy. According to Friedländer they exercised a strong influence over 15th-century Italian artists, a view Panofsky agrees with. However, Italian painters began to move beyond Netherlandish influences by the 1460s, as they concentrated on composition with a greater emphasis on harmony of parts belonging together – "that elegant harmony and grace ... which is called beauty", evident, for example, in Andrea Mantegna's Entombment. By the early 16th century, the reputation of the northern masters was such that there was an established north–south trade in their works, although many of the paintings or objects sent south were by lesser artists and of lower quality. Innovations introduced in the north and adopted in Italy included the setting of figures in domestic interiors and the viewing of interiors from multiple vantage points, through openings such as doors or windows. (Note: Described by Panofsky as "the interior viewed through a triple arcade". See Panofsky (1969), 142) Hugo van der Goes' Portinari Altarpiece, in Florence's Uffizi, played an important role in introducing Florentine painters to trends from the north, and artists like Giovanni Bellini came under the influence of northern painters working in Italy.

Memling successfully merged the two styles, exemplified in his Virgin and Child with Two Angels. By the mid-16th-century, however, Netherlandish art was seen as crude; Michelangelo claimed it was appealing only to "monks and friars". At this point northern art began to fall almost completely out of favour in Italy. By the 17th century, when Bruges had lost its prestige and position as the pre-eminent European trading city (the rivers silted and ports were forced to close), the Italians dominated European art.

== Destruction and dispersal ==
=== Iconoclasm ===
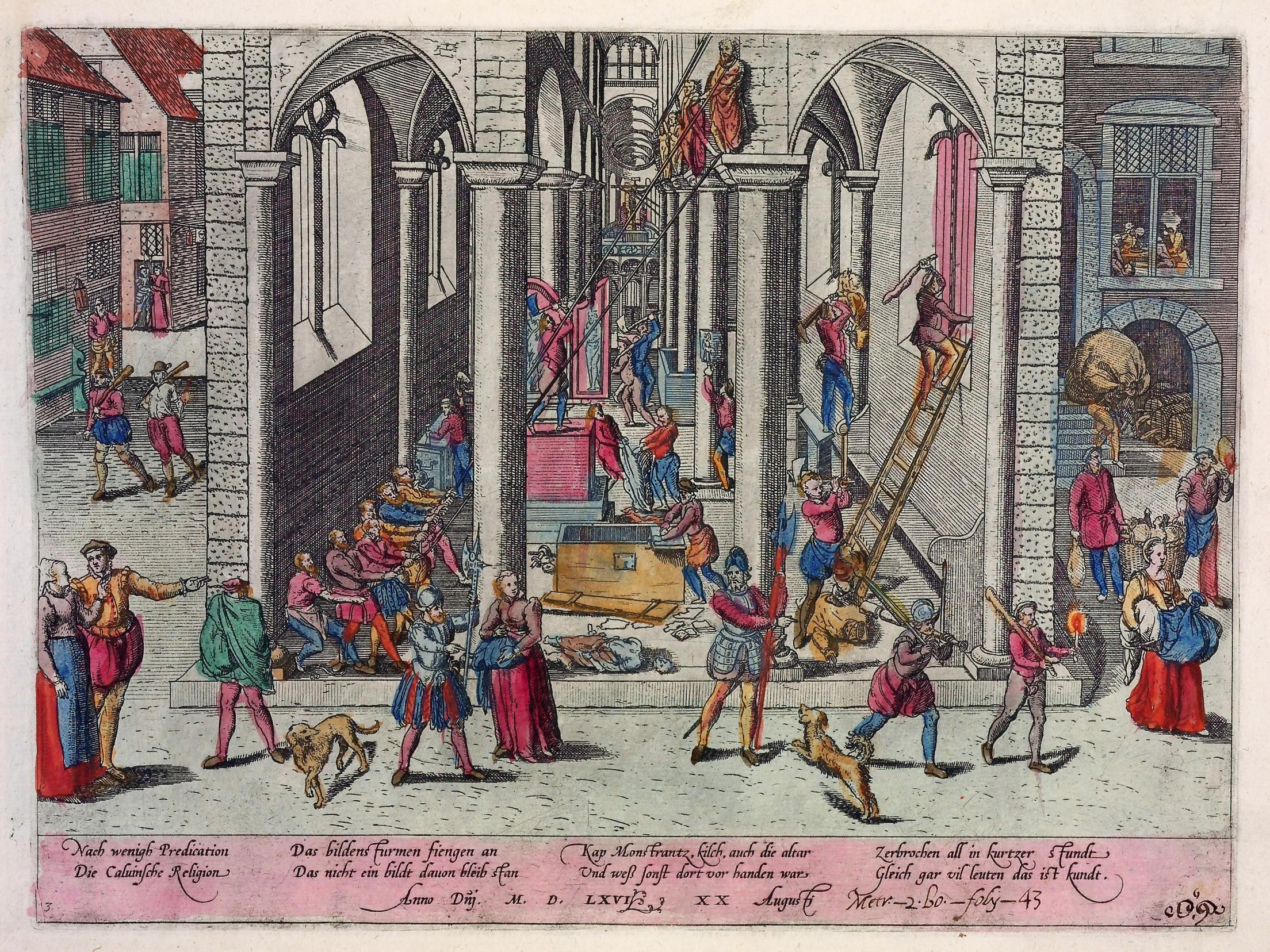
Print of the destruction in the Church of Our Lady in Antwerp, the "signature event" of the Beeldenstorm, August 20, 1566, by Frans Hogenberg

Religious images came under close scrutiny as actually or potentially idolatrous from the start of the Protestant Reformation in the 1520s. Martin Luther accepted some imagery, but few Early Netherlandish paintings met his criteria. Andreas Karlstadt, Huldrych Zwingli and John Calvin were wholly opposed to public religious images, above all in churches, and Calvinism soon became the dominant force in Netherlandish Protestantism. From 1520, outbursts of reformist iconoclasm broke out across much of Northern Europe. These might be official and peaceable, as in England under the Tudors and the English Commonwealth, or unofficial and often violent, as in the Beeldenstorm or "Iconoclastic Fury" in 1566 in the Netherlands. On 19 August 1566, this wave of mob destruction reached Ghent, where Marcus van Vaernewijck chronicled the events. He wrote of the Ghent Altarpiece being "taken to pieces and lifted, panel by panel, into the tower to preserve it from the rioters". Antwerp saw very thorough destruction in its churches in 1566, followed by more losses in the Spanish Sack of Antwerp in 1576, and a further period of official iconoclasm in 1581, which now included city and guild buildings, when Calvinists controlled the city council.

Many thousands of religious objects and artefacts were destroyed, including paintings, sculptures, altarpieces, stained glass, and crucifixes, and the survival rate of works by the major artists is low – even Jan van Eyck has only some 24 extant works confidently attributed to him. The number grows with later artists, but there are still anomalies; Petrus Christus is considered a major artist, but is given a smaller number of works than van Eyck. In general the later 15th-century works exported to southern Europe have a much higher survival rate.

Many of the period's artworks were commissioned by clergy for their churches, with specifications for a physical format and pictorial content that would complement existing architectural and design schemes. An idea of how such church interiors might have looked can be seen from both van Eyck's Madonna in the Church and van der Weyden's Exhumation of St Hubert. According to Nash, van der Weyden's panel is an insightful look at the appearance of pre-Reformation churches, and the manner in which images were placed so that they resonated with other paintings or objects. Nash goes on to say that, "any one would necessarily be seen in relation to other images, repeating, enlarging, or diversifying the chosen themes". Because iconoclasts targeted churches and cathedrals, important information about the display of individual works has been lost, and with it, insights about the meaning of these artworks in their own time. Many other works were lost to fires or in wars; the break-up of the Valois Burgundian state made the Low Countries the cockpit of European conflict until 1945. Van der Weyden's The Justice of Trajan and Herkinbald polyptych is perhaps the most significant loss; from records it appears to have been comparable in scale and ambition to the Ghent Altarpiece. It was destroyed by French artillery during the bombardment of Brussels in 1695, and is today known only from a tapestry copy.

=== Documentation ===
There have been significant challenges for art historians in establishing the names of Netherlandish masters and attributing specific works. The historical record is very poor, such that some major artists' biographies are still bare outlines, while attribution is an ongoing and often contentious debate. Even the most widely accepted attributions are typically only as a result of decades of scientific and historical research originating from after the start of the 20th century. Some painters, such as Adriaen Isenbrandt and Ambrosius Benson of Bruges, who were mass-producing panels to be sold at fair stalls, have had as many as 500 painting attributed to them.

The avenues for research have been limited by many historical factors. Many archives were destroyed in bombing campaigns in the two world wars, and a great number of works for which records do exist are themselves lost or destroyed. The record-keeping in the region was inconsistent, and often the export of works by major artists was, owing to the pressures of commercial demand, not adequately recorded. The practice of signing and dating works was rare until the 1420s, and while the inventories of collectors may have elaborately described the works, they attached little importance to recording the artist or workshop that produced them. Surviving documentation tends to come from inventories, wills, payment accounts, employment contracts and guild records and regulations.

Because Jan van Eyck's life is well documented in comparison to his contemporary painters, and because he was so clearly the period's innovator, a great number of works were attributed to him after art historians began to research the period. Today Jan is credited with about 26–28 extant works. This reduced number in part follows from the identification of other mid-15th-century painters such as van der Weyden, Christus and Memling, while Hubert, so highly regarded by late-19th-century critics, is now relegated as a secondary figure with no works definitively attributed to him. Many early Netherlandish masters have not been identified, and are today known by "names of convenience", usually of the "Master of ..." format. The practice lacks an established descriptor in English, but the "notname" term is often used, a derivative of a German term. (Note: Typically pseudonyms are applied after common elements are established among a group of works. Art historians consider similarities of theme, style, iconography, biblical source and physical location before attributing work to an individual or workshop, then assign a generic name.) Collecting a group of works under one notname is often contentious; a set of works assigned one notname could have been produced by various artists whose artistic similarities can be explained by shared geography, training, and response to market-demand influences. Some major artists who were known by pseudonyms are now identified, sometimes controversially, as in the case of Campin, who is usually, but not always, associated with the Master of Flémalle.

Many unidentified late-14th- and early-15th-century northern artists were of the first rank, but have suffered academic neglect because they have not been attached to any historical person; as Nash puts it, "much of what cannot be firmly attributed remains less studied". Some art historians believe that this situation has fostered a lack of caution in connecting works with historical persons, and that such connections often rest on tenuous circumstantial evidence. The identities of a number of well-known artists have been founded on the basis of a single signed, documented or otherwise attributed work, from which follow further attributions based on technical evidence and geographical proximity. The so-called Master of the Legend of the Magdalen, who may have been Pieter van Coninxloo, is one of the more notable examples; others include Hugo van der Goes, Campin, Stefan Lochner and Simon Marmion.

The lack of surviving theoretical writing on art and recorded opinion from any of the pre-16th-century major artists presents still more difficulties in attribution. Dürer, in 1512, was the first artist of the era to properly set down in writing his theories of art, followed by Lucas de Heere in 1565 and Karel van Mander in 1604. Nash believes a more probable explanation for the absence of theoretical writing on art outside Italy is that the northern artists did not yet have the language to describe their aesthetic values, or saw no point in explaining in writing what they had achieved in painting. Surviving 15th-century appreciations of contemporary Netherlandish art are exclusively written by Italians, the best known of which include Cyriacus Ancona in 1449, Bartolomeo Facio in 1456, and Giovanni Santi in 1482.

== Rediscovery ==
The dominance of Northern Mannerism in the mid-16th century was built on a subversion of the conventions of Early Netherlandish art, which in turn fell out of public favour. Yet it remained popular in some royal art collections; Mary of Hungary and Philip II of Spain both sought out Netherlandish painters, sharing a preference for van der Weyden and Bosch. By the early 17th century, no collection of repute was complete without 15th- and 16th-century northern European works; the emphasis however tended to be on the Northern Renaissance as a whole, more towards the German Albrecht Dürer, by far the most collectable northern artist of the era. Giorgio Vasari in 1550 and Karel van Mander (c. 1604) placed the art works of era at the heart of Northern Renaissance art. Both writers were instrumental in forming later opinion about the region's painters, with emphasis on van Eyck as the innovator.

The Netherlandish painters were largely forgotten in the 18th century. When the Louvre Palace was converted to an art gallery during the French Revolution, Gerard David's Marriage at Cana – then attributed to van Eyck – was the only piece of Netherlandish art on display there. More large panels were added to the collection after the French conquered the Low Countries. (Note: The central panels of the Ghent Altarpiece, van Eyck's Virgin and Child with Canon van der Paele, and Memling's Morel Triptych) These works had a profound effect on German literary critic and philosopher Karl Schlegel, who after a visit in 1803 wrote an analysis of Netherlandish art, sending it to Ludwig Tieck, who had the piece published in 1805.

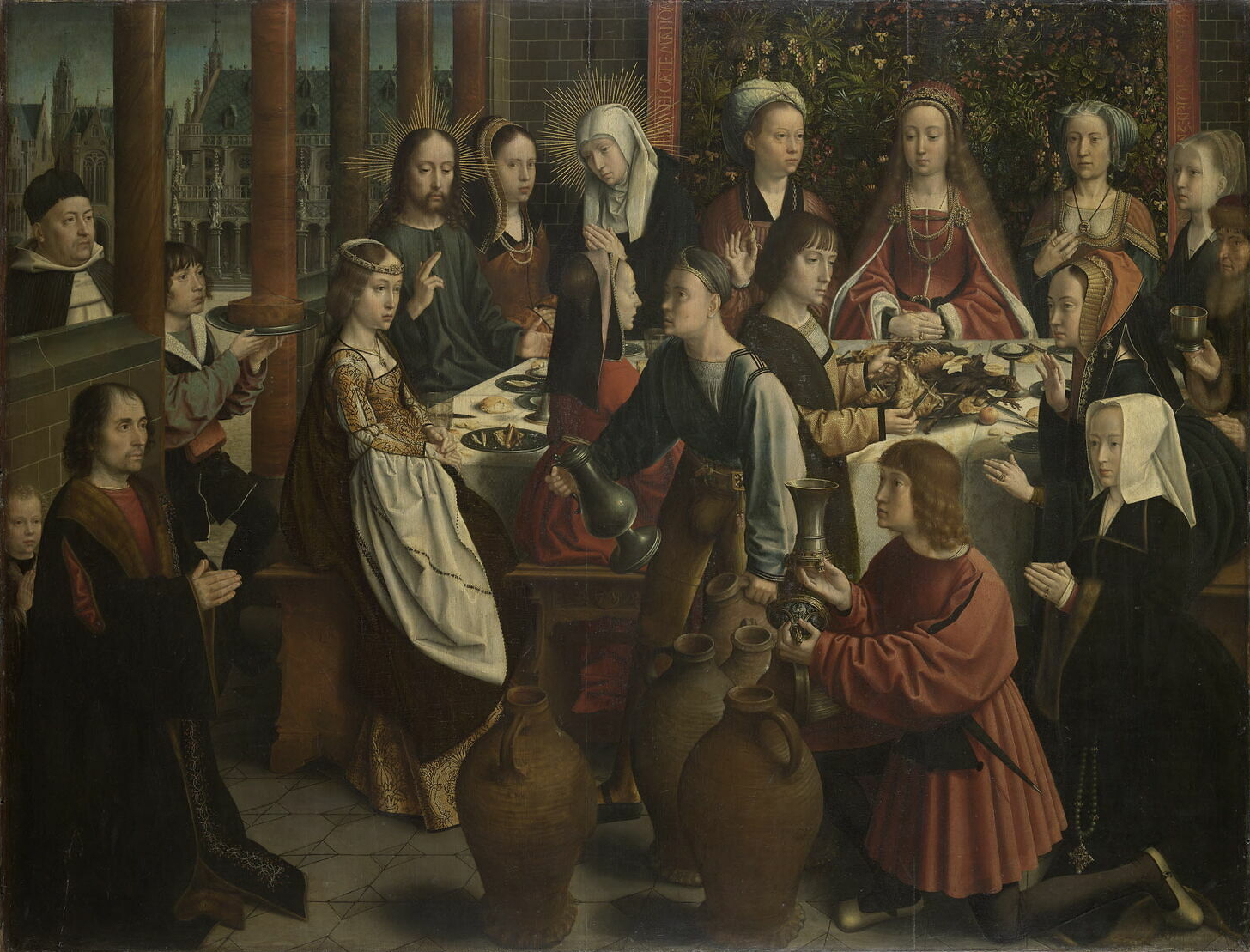
Gerard David, Marriage at Cana, c. 1500. Louvre, Paris. This work was first publicly displayed in 1802, attributed to van Eyck. Art historians in the 19th century were preoccupied with the difficulties of attribution.

In 1821 Johanna Schopenhauer became interested in the work of Jan van Eyck and his followers, having seen early Netherlandish and Flemish paintings in the collection of the brothers Sulpiz and Melchior Boisserée in Heidelberg. (Note: The Boisserée collection was acquired in 1827, on the advice of Johann Georg von Dillis, to form part of the nucleus of the Alte Pinakothek, Munich. See Ridderbos (2005), 86) Schopenhauer did primary archival research because there was very little historical record of the masters, apart from official legal documents. She published Johann van Eyck und seine Nachfolger in 1822, the same year Gustav Friedrich Waagen published the first modern scholarly work on early Netherlandish painting, Ueber Hubert van Eyck und Johann van Eyck; Waagen's work drew on Schlegel and Schopenhauer's earlier analyses. Waagen went on to become director of the Gemäldegalerie in Berlin, amassing a collection of Netherlandish art, including most of the Ghent panels, a number of van der Weyden triptychs, and a Bouts altarpiece. Subjecting the works to meticulous analysis and examination in the course of acquisition, based on distinguishing characteristics of individual artists, he established an early scholarly system of classification.

In 1830 the Belgian Revolution split Belgium from the Netherlands of today; as the newly created state sought to establish a cultural identity, Memling's reputation came to equal that of van Eyck in the 19th century. Memling was seen as the older master's match technically, and as possessing a deeper emotional resonance. When in 1848 the collection of Prince Ludwig of Oettingen-Wallerstein at Schloss Wallerstein was forced onto the market, his cousin Prince Albert arranged a viewing at Kensington Palace; though a catalogue of works attributed to the School of Cologne, Jan van Eyck and van der Weyden was compiled by Waagen, there were no other buyers so Albert purchased them himself. At a period when London's National Gallery sought to increase its prestige, Charles Eastlake purchased Rogier van der Weyden's The Magdalen Reading panel in 1860 from Edmond Beaucousin's "small but choice" collection of early Netherlandish paintings.

Netherlandish art became popular with museum-goers in the late 19th century. At the beginning of the 20th century, van Eyck and Memling were the most highly regarded, with van der Weyden and Christus little more than footnotes. Later many of the works then attributed to Memling were found to be from van der Weyden or his workshop. In 1902, Bruges hosted the first exhibition of Netherlandish art with 35,000 visitors, an event that was a "turning point in the appreciation of early Netherlandish art". For a number of reasons, the chief of which was the difficulty of securing paintings for the exhibition, only a few of van Eyck's and van der Weyden's panels were displayed, while almost 40 of Memling's pieces were shown. Nevertheless, van Eyck and van der Weyden, to an extent, were then considered the first rank of Netherlandish artists.

The Bruges exhibition renewed interest in the period and initiated scholarship that was to flourish in the 20th century. Johan Huizinga was the first historian to place Netherlandish art squarely in the Burgundian period – outside of nationalistic borders – suggesting in his book The Waning of the Middle Ages, published in 1919, that the flowering of the school in the early 15th century resulted wholly from the tastes set by the Burgundian court. Another exhibition visitor, Georges Hulin de Loo, published an independent critical catalogue highlighting the large number of mistakes in the official catalogue, which had used attributions and descriptions from the owners. He and Max Friedländer, who visited and wrote a review of the Bruges exhibition, went on to become leading scholars in the field.

== Scholarship and conservation ==
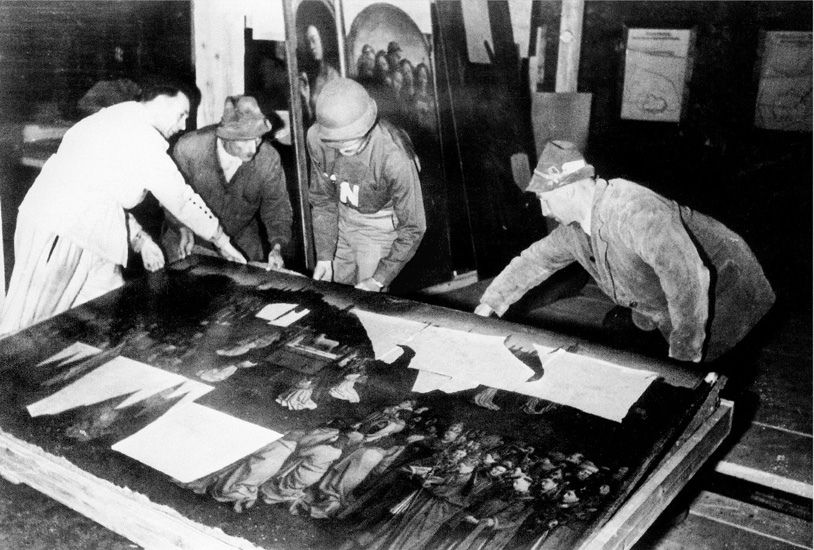
The Ghent Altarpiece during recovery from the Altaussee salt mine at the end of World War II. The pioneering conservation work on these panels in the 1950s led to advances in methodology and technical application

The most significant early research of Early Netherlandish art occurred in the 1920s, in German art historian Max Jakob Friedländer's pioneering Meisterwerke der Niederländischen Malerei des 15. und 16. Jahrhunderts. Friedländer focused on the biographical details of the painters, establishing attribution, and examining their major works. The undertaking proved extremely difficult, given the scant historical record of even the most significant artists. Fellow-German Erwin Panofsky's analysis in the 1950s and 1960s followed and in many ways challenged Friedländer's work. Writing in the United States, Panofsky made the work of the German art historians accessible to the English-speaking world for the first time. He effectively legitimized Netherlandish art as a field of study, and raised its status to something similar to the early Italian renaissance.

Panofsky was one of the first art historians to abandon formalism. He built on Friedländer's attempts at attribution, but focused more on social history and religious iconography. Panofsky developed the terminology with which the Netherlandish paintings are usually described, and made significant advances identifying the rich religious symbolism especially of the major altarpieces. Panofsky was the first scholar to connect the work of Netherlandish painters and illuminators, noticing the considerable overlap. He considered the study of manuscripts to be integral to the study of panels, though in the end came to view illumination as less significant than panel painting – as a prelude to the truly significant work of the northern artists of the 15th and 16th centuries.

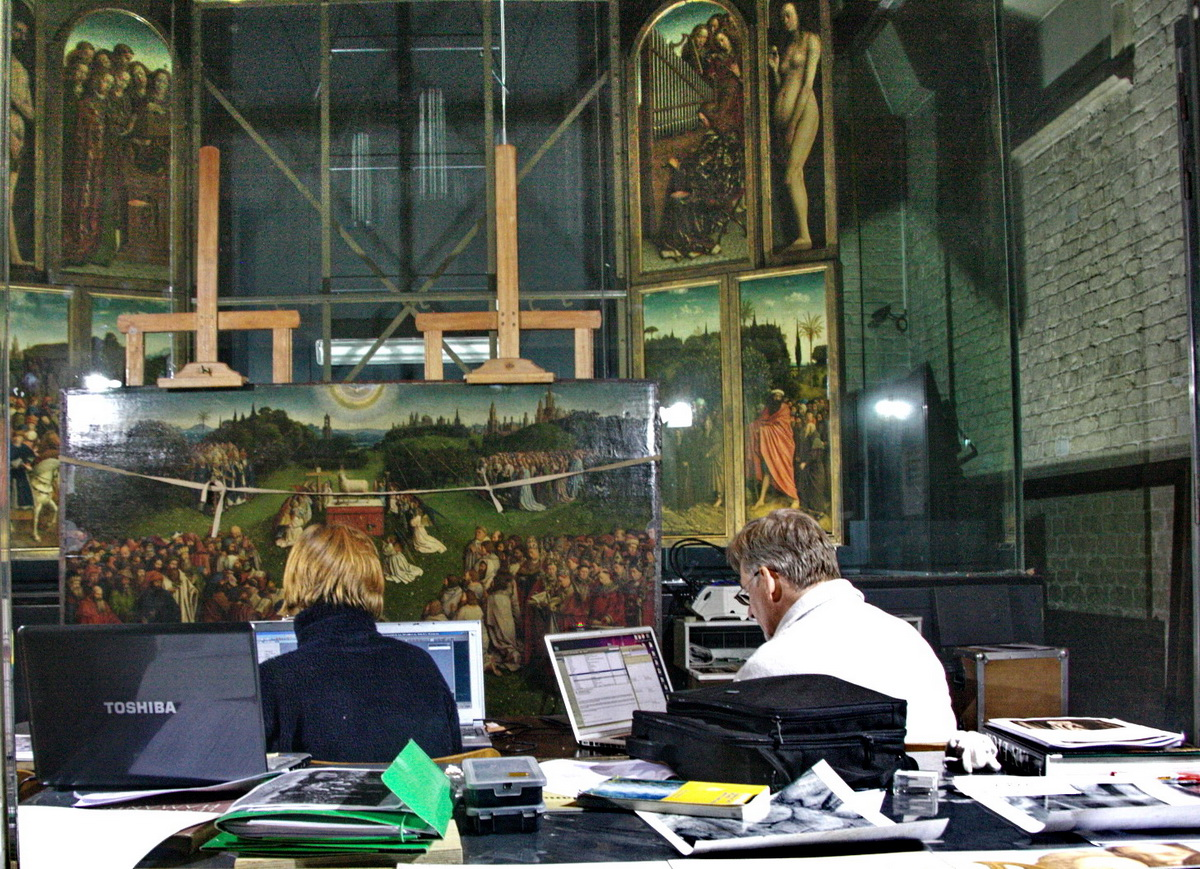
The Ghent Altarpiece during technical analysis in Saint Bavo's Cathedral

Otto Pächt and Friedrich Winkler continued and developed on Panofsky's work. They were key in identifying sources of iconography and ascribing attribution, or at least differentiating anonymous masters under names of convenience. The paucity of surviving documentation has made attribution especially difficult, a problem compounded by the workshop system. It was not until the late 1950s, after the research of Friedländer, Panofsky and Meyer Schapiro, that the attributions generally accepted today were established. (Note: In the 1960s and 1970s Lotte Brand Philip and Elisabeth Dhanens built on Panofsky's work, and resolved many of the issues that Panofsky had struggled with, especially in relation to identifying the sources of iconography, and attributing works of the early to mid-15th century.)

More recent research from art historians such as Lorne Campbell relies on X-ray and infrared photography to develop an understanding of the techniques and materials used by the painters. The conservation of the Ghent Altarpiece in the mid-1950s pioneered methodologies and scholarship in technical studies. Examination of paint layers and underlayers was later applied to other Netherlandish works, allowing for more accurate attributions. Van Eyck's work, for example, typically shows underdrawings unlike Christus' work. These discoveries, too, hint at the relationships between the masters of the first rank and those in the following generations, with Memling's underdrawings clearly showing van der Weyden's influence.

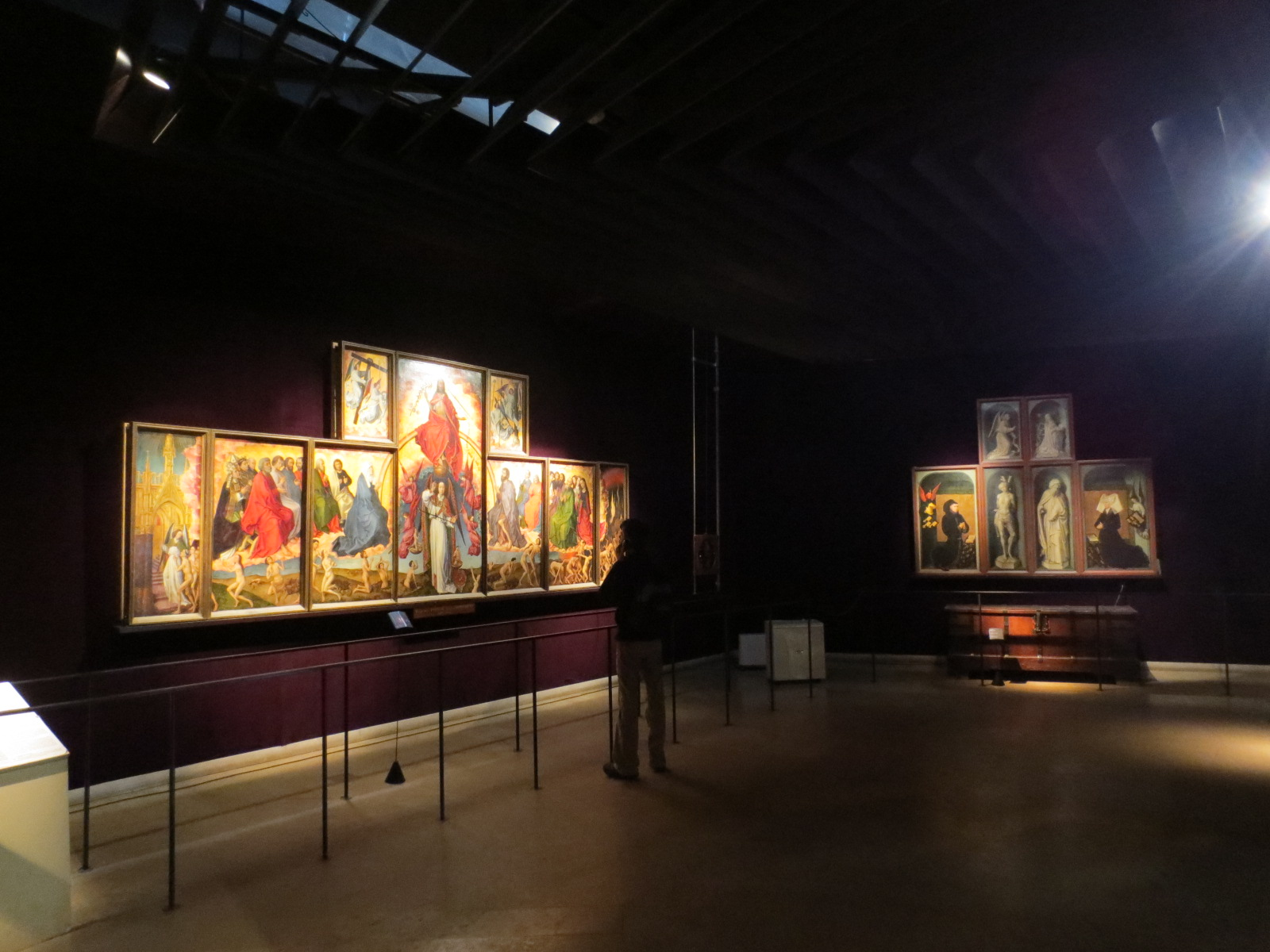
Van der Weyden's Beaune Altarpiece, both sides displayed simultaneously

Scholarship since the 1970s has tended to move away from a pure study of iconography, instead emphasizing the paintings' and artists' relation to the social history of their time. According to Craig Harbison, "Social history was becoming increasingly important. Panofsky had never really talked about what kind of people these were." Harbison sees the works as objects of devotion with a "prayer book mentality" available to middle-class burghers who had the means and the inclination to commission devotional objects. Most recent scholarship is moving away from the focus on religious iconography; instead, it investigates how a viewer is meant to experience a piece, as with donor paintings that were meant to elicit the feeling of a religious vision. James Marrow thinks the painters wanted to evoke specific responses, which are often hinted at by the figures' emotions in the paintings.
