= Fall of the Damned (disambiguation) =

The Fall of the Damned is a painting by Peter Paul Rubens.

Fall of the Damned may also refer to:

- Fall of the Damned into Hell, a painting by Hieronymus Bosch
- The Fall of the Damned (Bouts), a painting by Dirk Bouts

== See also ==
- The Fall of the Rebel Angels (disambiguation)
