= The Fall of the Rebel Angels (disambiguation) =

The Fall of the Rebel Angels may refer to:

== Paintings ==
- The Fall of the Rebel Angels, Peter Bruegel the Elder, 1562
- The Fall of the Rebel Angels (Giordano), c. 1666
- The Fall of the Rebel Angels (Floris), 1554
- The Fall of the Damned, Rubens, c. 1620

== Film ==
- The Fall of the Rebel Angels (film)

== See also ==
- Fall of the Damned (disambiguation)
- The Fall of a Rebel Angel, 2016 album by Enigma
