= Constant Mongé-Misbach =

French painter (1806–1871)

Constant Mongé-Misbach or Constant Misbach (5 January 1806 – 18 January 1871) was a French painter, specialising in history painting. He died unmarried without issue and so the Misbach line of artists died out with him, though he is well known for donating two studies by his tutor Jean Bonvoisin to the Louvre Museum (St Sebastian, assigned to Clermont-Ferrand in 1876, and Paris as a Shepherd, assigned to Avranches in 1876 but destroyed during the Second World War), followed by sixteen Old Master paintings on his death, including Dirk Bouts' Lamentation of Christ (the Louvre's first acquisition after the Second French Empire).

== Life ==
He was born in Paris to Claude-Modeste Mongé (died 1808) and Anne-Suzanne-Aglaé Cudot. After his father's death his mother married Sébastien-Joseph Misbach, who taught Constant from the age of three onwards and finally adopted him on 1 April 1830. He spent his youth studying painting, history, poetry and literature and was particularly devoted to the art of Nicolas Poussin. In the composition and execution of his works he principally followed the academic style rather than his own taste.

He exhibited at the Salon of Paris eleven times between 1831 and 1850, exclusively showing mythological or biblical subjects. He died unmarried at his home at 34 rue Rollin (previously rue Neuve-Saint-Étienne) in the 5th arrondissement of Paris and buried with his mother and adoptive father in the family vault in the 12th division of the cimetière du Montparnasse - the inscription on their tomb was reproduced in 1885's Revue de l'art français ancien et moderne and reads SÉPULTURE DE S.-J. MISBACH, ARTISTE PEINTRE, DÉCÉDÉ LE 11 AOUT 1853. PRIEZ POUR LUI. S.-M.-C. MONGÉ MISBACH, ARTISTE PEINTRE, DÉCÉDÉ LE 18 JANVIER 1871. ASA CUDOT femme MISBACH décédée le 17 mars 1850"
