= Lamentation of Christ (Bouts) =

Painting by Dieric Bouts

- French: Déploration du Christ, Dutch: Bewening
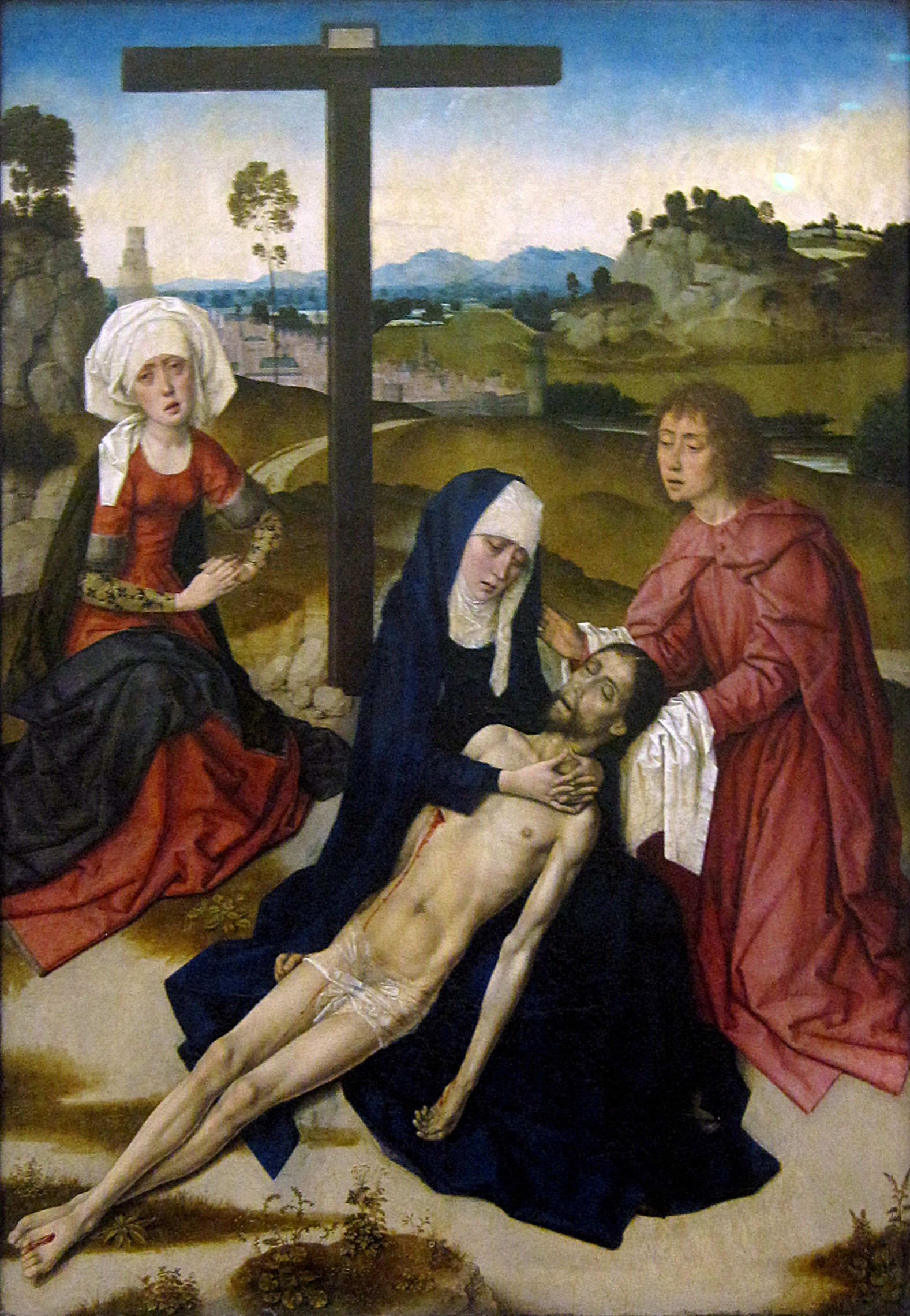
- Artist: Dieric Bouts
- Year: c. 1460
- Catalogue: A3
- Medium: Oil on oak panel
- Movement: Early Netherlandish
- Dimensions: 68.9 cm × 49 cm (27.1 in × 19 in)
- Location: Musée du Louvre, Paris
- Accession: RF 1
- Website: https://collections.louvre.fr/en/ark:/53355/cl010061548

Lamentation of Christ is an Early Netherlandish panel painting made 1455–1460 by Flemish painter Dieric Bouts of the Lamentation of Christ. the picture was bequeathed to the Louvre Museum by Constant Mongé-Misbach in 1871, at which time it was misattributed to Rogier van der Weyden. It remains in that museum's collection as RF 1.

== Composition ==
The subject, which commemorates the passion and death of Christ, arose in Byzantine art of the 11th century and would have served as a devotional object for focused contemplation, likely inspired by the Meditationes of the Pseudo-Bonaventura. The scene had become a popular one for artists and patrons in northern continental Europe by the 15th century.

The rectangular panel shows the nearly naked, rigid body of the deceased Christ on a diagonal, held and supported in the lap of his mother, Mary. Both are attended by the figure of John the Evangelist in red, offering a white linen cloth to support Christ's head, to Mary's proper left. Mary Magdalene kneels in the middle ground, wrenching her hands in a gesture of grief, after a motif from Rogier van der Weyden's Descent from the Cross. A wooden tau cross stands off center and in the middle ground. A landscape of countryside around an imaginary Jerusalem recedes in the background with atmospheric perspective, under a blue and white sky. Details of carefully observed vegetation, likely after the manner of Jan van Eyck, appear in the lower foreground and in the distant background.

The Bouts Lamentation shows marked stylistic and compositional debt to Van der Weyden, especially in the emotion expressed by the Magdalene. The staid, restrained grief of the Mary and John bespeaks a signature Bouts style, where "time appears to be suspended in a moment of intense emotion, but one that is expressed calmly." The rendering of John's hair and face recall that of the figure of John in Bouts' Altarpiece of the Holy Sacrament, made in the mid- to late-1640s.

== Attribution and source material ==
Among the artist's larger-scale religious works, the Lamentation may have been the central panel of a triptych, where the wings have been lost. It may also have come from the Bouts workshop in Leuven, after a lost original.

Max Friedländer saw the work as early in the artist's oeuvre, based on "bony hands and lively contour of the Savior's body." Others base the period on the influence of Rogier van der Weyden.

Endpoints for when the panel may have been created extend from 1445 (when van der Weyden's Milaflores altarpiece would have been available as a model) through 1466, the year identified by dendrochronologiccal analysis as the date for the panel of the copy of the Bouts Lamentation in Frankfurt.

Evidence of tracing and some inconsistencies in style maybe argue for a reassignment of attribution, according to Catheline Périer-D’Ieteren, who insists the painting would have been made in the Bouts workshop (if not entirely by the artist himself) after an original painting there.

== Condition ==
Scholars have consistently remarked upon the panel's satisfactory condition. The painting's whereabouts are unclear prior to 1871; it received conservation treatments in 1951, 1957, 1972, 1974, and 1978. It has been loaned to at least two exhibitions in the 20th century.

At least five copies of the Bouts treatment of the subject exist, listed in catalogs by Max Friedländer and Wolfgang Schoene, including pictures now in the Städel Museum and the Museo Thyssen-Bornemisza. The Madrid example is the center panel of a triptych, and now ascribed to the Master of the Legend of Saint Lucy.
