= The Fall of the Rebel Angels (Floris) =

Painting by Frans Floris

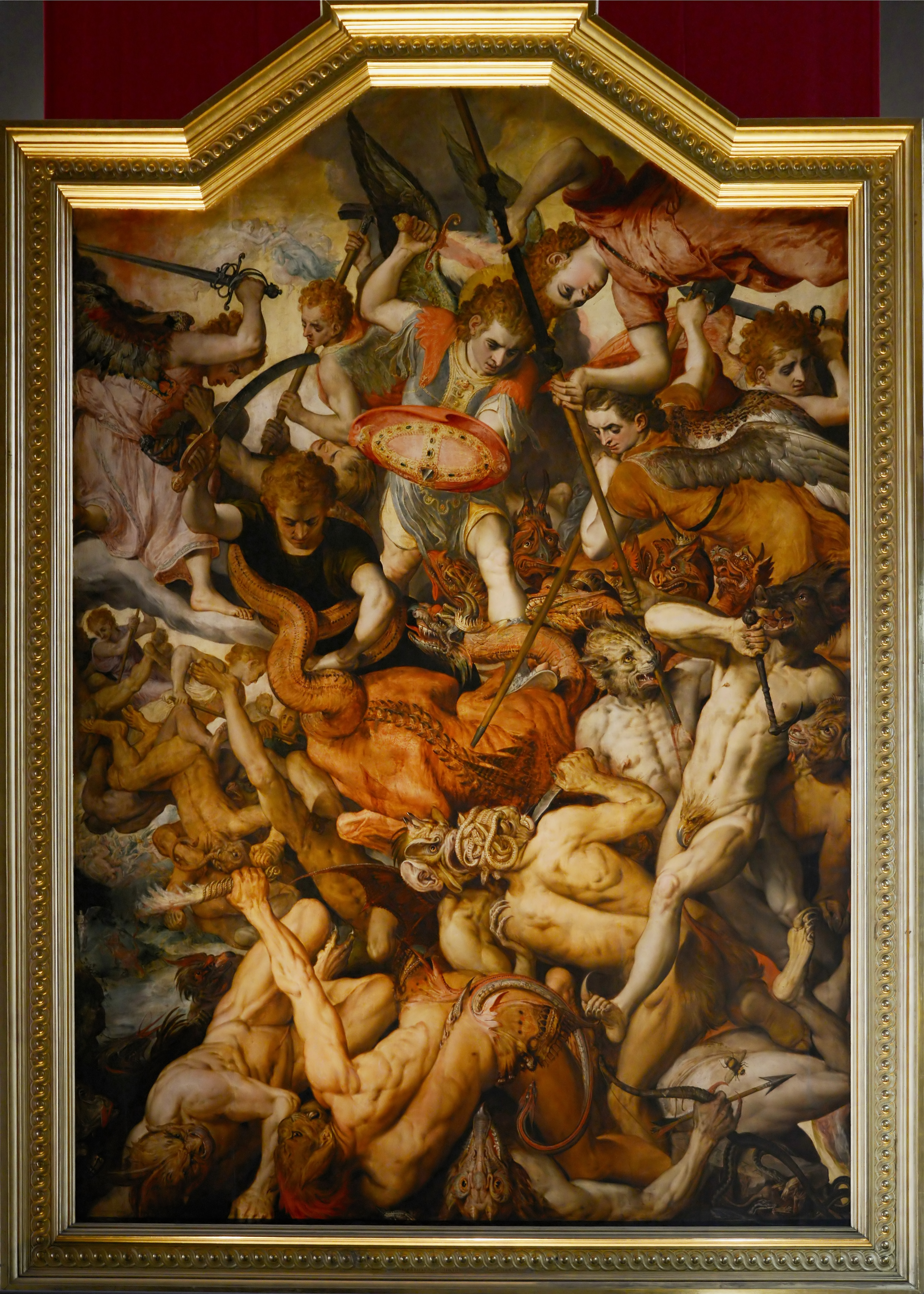
- Artist: Frans Floris
- Year: 1554
- Catalogue: 112
- Medium: Oil on canvas
- Dimensions: 303 cm × 220 cm (119.3 in × 86.6 in)
- Location: Royal Museum of Fine Arts Antwerp; Antwerp

The Fall of the Rebel Angels is an oil on panel painting by Flemish painter Frans Floris. The painting was the central panel of a triptych. The side panels, however, were lost during the iconoclastic fury in the summer of 1566. The scene represented in the painting stems from Chapter 12 of the Book of Revelation. It is one of Floris' most renowned works, often credited as his most famous painting. Floris painted it for the fencer's guild of Antwerp, one of the city's militias, responsible for public security. The altarpiece hung in the Cathedral of Our Lady in Antwerp, above the guild's altar. Like every other guild or corporation, the fencers had a patron saint, in this case, the Archangel Michael, who leads God's angels against the rebels in the painting.

The painting is currently housed at the Royal Museum of Fine Arts in Antwerp.

== Analysis ==
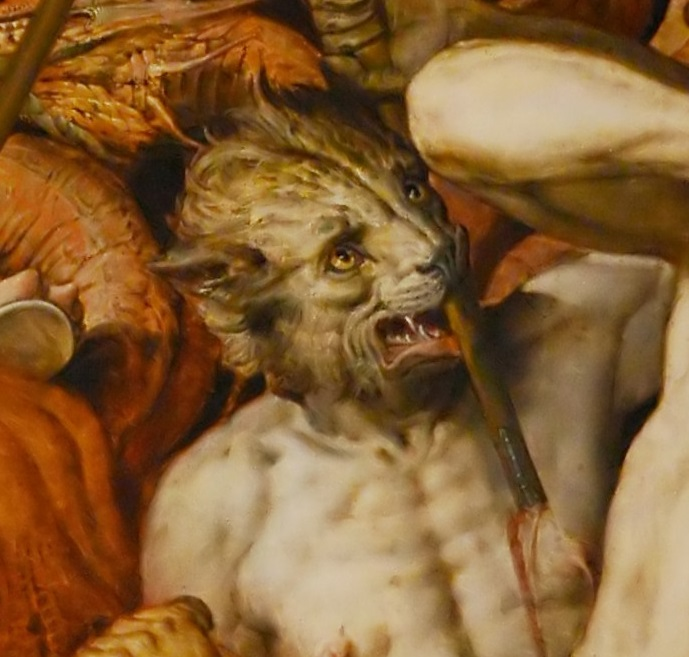
Detail, feline daemon

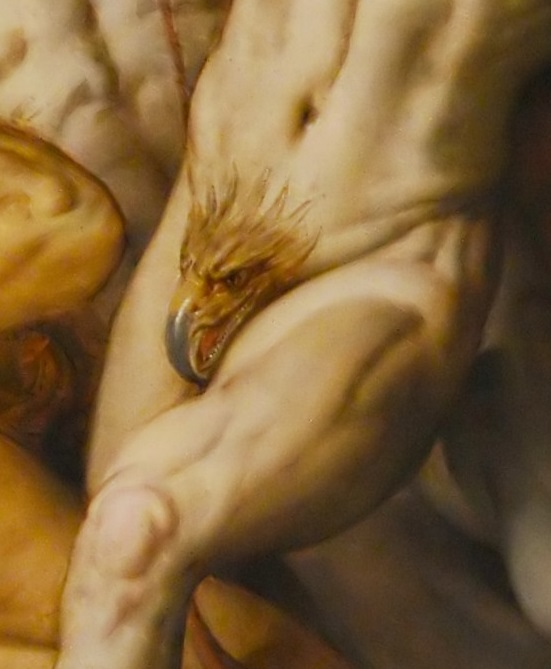
Detail, eagle genitals

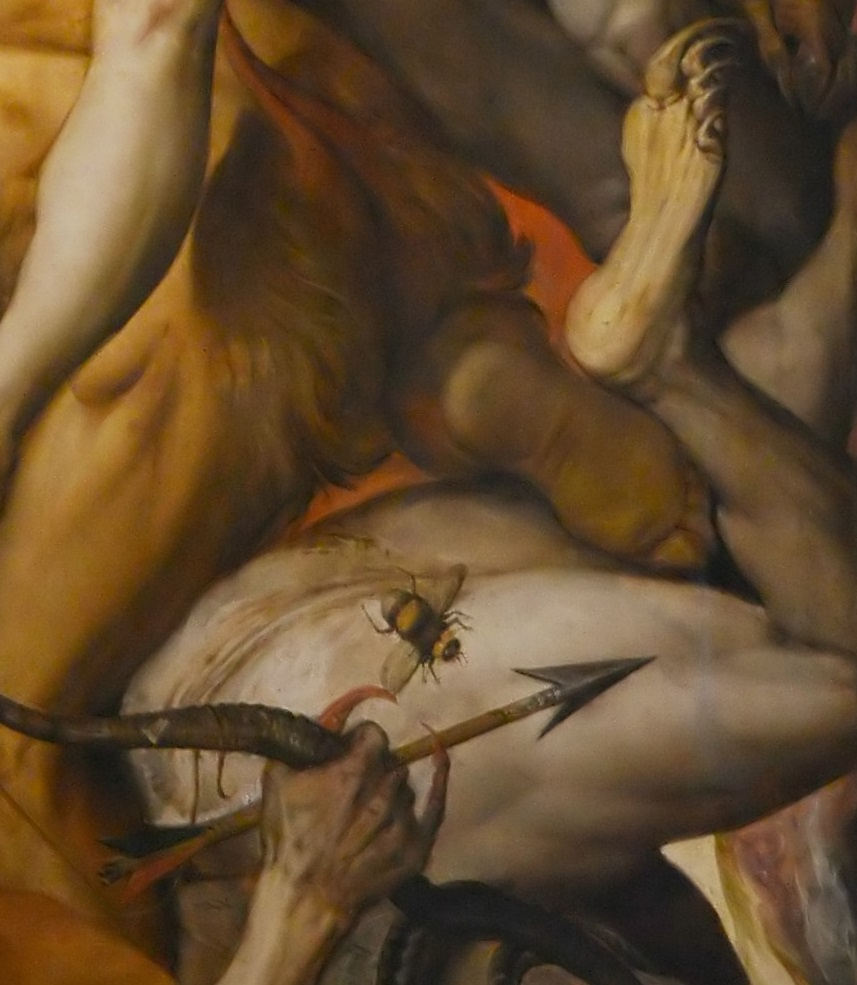
Detail, bee on daemon/rebellious angel's buttocks

This painting depicts a biblical battle between good and evil. The fight goes back to John 's Apocalyptic vision and symbolizes Christ's fight against evil. It's a dense tangle of arms, legs, wings and tails. God's angel, led by Archangel Michael, are engaging in battle with the rebellious angels, chasing the seven-headed dragon and its demons from heaven. The fallen angels are depicted as half-human, half-animal monsters, as in Bruegel's later The Fall of the Rebel Angels. In Floris, their features include curved talons, genitals like an eagle's head, clawing hands, a head of a wild boar, and a grinning goat's head.

The Archangel Michael was considered, among other things, Guardian of Paradise and Warrior against the Devil. In those functions, he might have set an example for the members of the fencer's guild (who commissioned the painting). They might have seen themselves as Milites Christiani fighting evil in the name of Jesus. This would have justified their actions as law enforcement or medieval police within the city. The angels fight with weapons used by the fencers. These are the sword, the épée and the lance. The rebellious angels use bows and arrows, hatchets, torches, knives, and pickaxes; a hodgepodge of unorthodox battle instruments.

The painting shows Floris' knowledge of anatomy. Floris incorporated some subtle supplements among the writhing bodies, such as the Woman of the Apocalypse from the Book of Revelation. She is located in the small gap on the left, near the flaming torch clutched by one of the fallen angels. She stands on a crescent moon, dressed with the sun and crowned with twelve stars. The dragon wants to devour her child, but the angels are already taking it to heaven. An eagle gives her two wings so she can escape to the desert. On the bottom right, there sits a bee.

== Influence ==
Frans Floris was a symbol of Antwerp Romanism, and the first artist in the Southern Netherlands to organize his studio after an Italian model. Floris was one of the many Flemish artists from the 16th century who travelled to Italy. During his stay in Rome, Floris was influenced by the work of Italian Renaissance artists Michelangelo and Raphael. Floris composition and its writhing bodies recall Michelangelo's Last Judgement in the Sistine Chapel. The woman and the dragon, on the other hand, show similarities with the visual language of the German artist Albrecht Dürer.

Bruegel picked up the subject in 1562 for his own The Fall of the Rebel Angels. Rubens painted his Fall of the Damned in 1620, and Luca Giordano painted his own version in 1666.

== Sources ==
- "The Fall of the Rebel Angels". KMSKA.
- "Val van de opstandige engelen". www.kmska.be.
- "The Fall of the Rebellious Angels". Web Gallery of Art.
