= The Ascension of the Elect =

c. 1470 painting by Dieric Bouts

- Aards paradijs en opgang van de glukzaligen naae het hemels (Dutch), L'Ascension des élus (French)
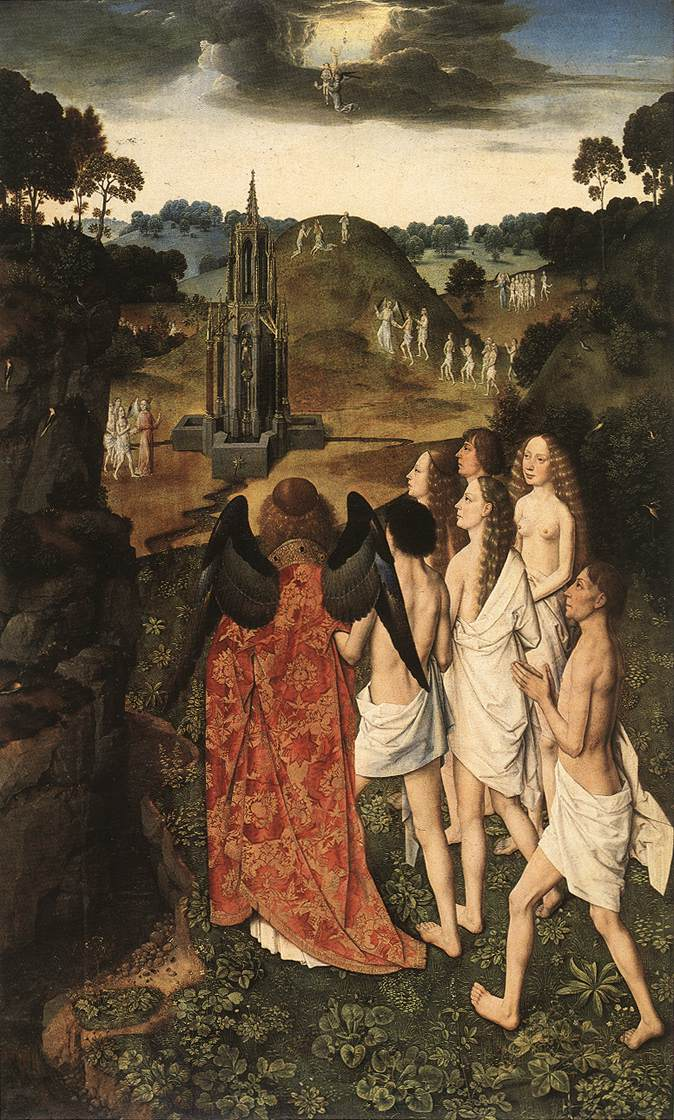
- Artist: Dieric Bouts
- Year: c. 1470
- Catalogue: 16
- Medium: oil on panel
- Movement: Early Netherlandish, Primitifs flamands
- Dimensions: 115 cm × 69,5 cm (45 in × 274 in)
- Location: Palais des Beaux-Arts, Lille
- Accession: 747
- Website: https://pba.lille.fr/Collections/Chefs-d-OEuvre/Moyen-Age-et-Renaissance/L-Ascension-des-elus-dit-aussi-Le-Paradis/(plus)

The Ascension of the Elect is a c. 1470 oil on panel painting by the Early Netherlandish painter Dieric Bouts, originally produced as part of a triptych of the Last Judgment commissioned by the town of Louvain in 1468. The central panel is lost but the other side panel, The Fall of the Damned, survives. Concerning the Elect in the end times, the painting draws on Genesis 2:10, Book of Revelation and The Purgatory of St Patrick, a 14th-century Irish manuscript by Berol telling of Sir Owein's legendary trip to Purgatory. Ascension is now in the Palais des Beaux-Arts de Lille.

== Subject and source material ==
The subjects of the two wings (as well as hinges and locks on the side panels) imply a missing center panel of a Last Judgment scene. Hilde Claes writes that "the relationship between The Road to Heaven and the Fall of the Damned is worked out so ingeniously that both compositions almost certainly belonged together."

Catheline Périer-D’Ieteren writes that while traditionally "the elect" ascend a stairway to heaven, here they walk on a path rich and lyrical in plant and animal life toward a terrestrial paradise. An angel in a red robe guides them toward the "fountain of life" described in Revelation.

While Bouts reorganized and separated the content, the artists likely drew upon Jan van Eyck's Last Judgement, now in the Metropolitan Museum of Art, and Rogier van der Weyden's treatment of the subject at Beaune. The treatment of vegetation in the foreground recalls the painting in oil by the brothers Jan and Hubert van Eyck at Ghent.

== Patronage and function ==
A contract between the town of Leuven and Bouts signed in 1468 documents the commissioning of two painting projects—the Justice of Emperor Otto for the town hall and an altarpiece on the subject of the Last Judgement. From the 15th century to 1899, however, the attribution of the work had been uncertain.

== Condition and conservation ==
The frame is original. There is evidence of a former hinge on the left, and hardware for a lock on the right. The picture received restoration in 1543 and 1628, and conservation treatments in 1965 and 1997.

The panel was included in exhibitions in 1918 at Valenciennes, in 1947 at Paris, in 1970 in Lille, and 1998 in Louvain.
