= The Fall of the Damned (Bouts) =

c. 1470 painting by Dieric Bouts

- Val der verdoemden in de hel, De val van de verdoemden (Dutch), La Chute des damnés (French)
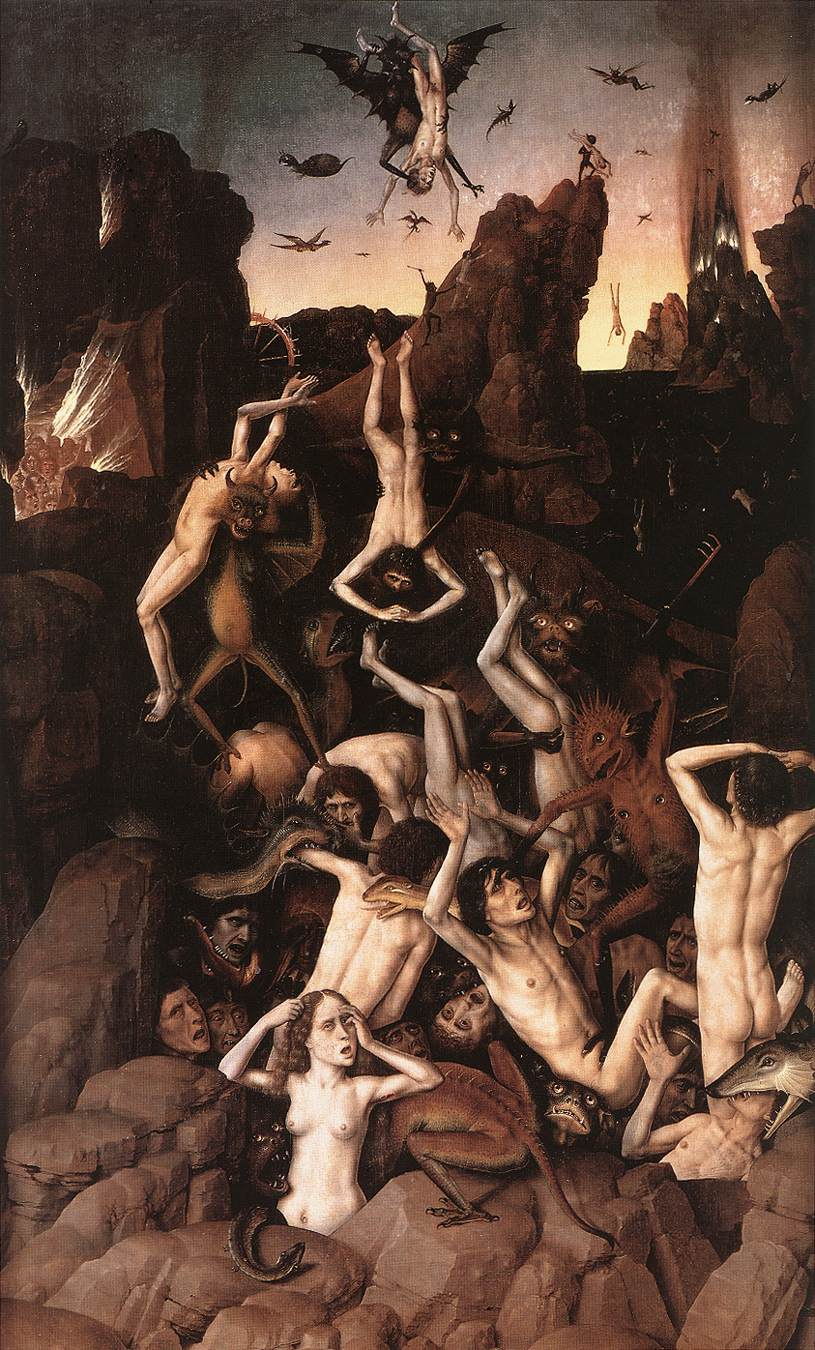
- Artist: Dirk Bouts
- Year: c. 1468
- Catalogue: 17
- Medium: oil on panel
- Movement: Early Netherlandish, Primitifs flamands
- Dimensions: 115 cm × 69,5 cm (45 in × 274 in)
- Location: Palais des Beaux-Arts, Lille
- Accession: P1808 (Louvre inv. RF 1113)
- Website: https://pba.lille.fr/Collections/Chefs-d-OEuvre/Moyen-Age-et-Renaissance/La-Chute-des-damnes

The Fall of the Damned (Dutch: De Val van de verdoemden) is an oil on panel painting by the Early Netherlandish painter Dieric Bouts, completed in 1470. It was produced as the rightmost section of a triptych of a Last Judgment scene commissioned for the town hall of Louvain, Belgium, in 1468. The central panel of the triptych is lost, but the left side panel (or shutter), the Ascension of the Elect, survives along with the Fall of the Damned. The set of images would have drawn narrative inspiration from Genesis 2:10, the Book of Revelation and from the Purgatory of St Patrick, a 14th-century Irish manuscript by Berol telling of Sir Owein's legendary trip to Purgatory. The Fall has been on permanent loan from the Louvre to the Palais des Beaux-Arts de Lille, where it has been reunited with the Ascension since 1957.

The triptych was commissioned for the town hall of Louvain in mid-1468, with a contract signed later that year. Records further show that it would have been completed in 1469 and installed in the town hall in 1470. "The appearance of the missing central panel is known from a crude copy in the Munich Alte Pinakothek."

Writers note how the two outer paintings function as pendants in their striking but harmonious pairing, featuring a green, earthly paradise on the left against the "contrasting shapes, color, figures and their expressions of torment" in the right panel. There, Hilde Clase writes, "in a volcanic landscape, the damned are sinking into the hell from the weight of their sins" in a "well-balanced composition."

Further evidence for the relationship of the two works is drawn from the alignment of carpentry and metalwork for hinges and a lock, suggesting the outer panels would have served as shutters over a central panel while in closed position.

Max Friedländer assigned the panel as "belong[ing] to the master's mature works."

Bouts evidently took inspiration for the theme and content from the conventional depiction of the Last Judgment, but also the Visio Tnugdali. Art historians have found sources for Bouts specific choices in the work of Rogier van der Weyden (for example, his Last Judgment in Beaune), from Hans Memling's treatment of the subject in Gdansk and from the pictorial tradition of illuminated manuscripts The composition and mood of Bouts' example were taken up by Hieronymus Bosch in his Fall of the Damned into Hell from 1490 and Simon Marmion's Visions of Tondal from 1475. The Bouts painting received cleaning, repair, or conservation treatments in 1543, 1628, 1904, 1941, 1951, 1971 and 1997.
