= Dieric Bouts =

15th-century Dutch painter

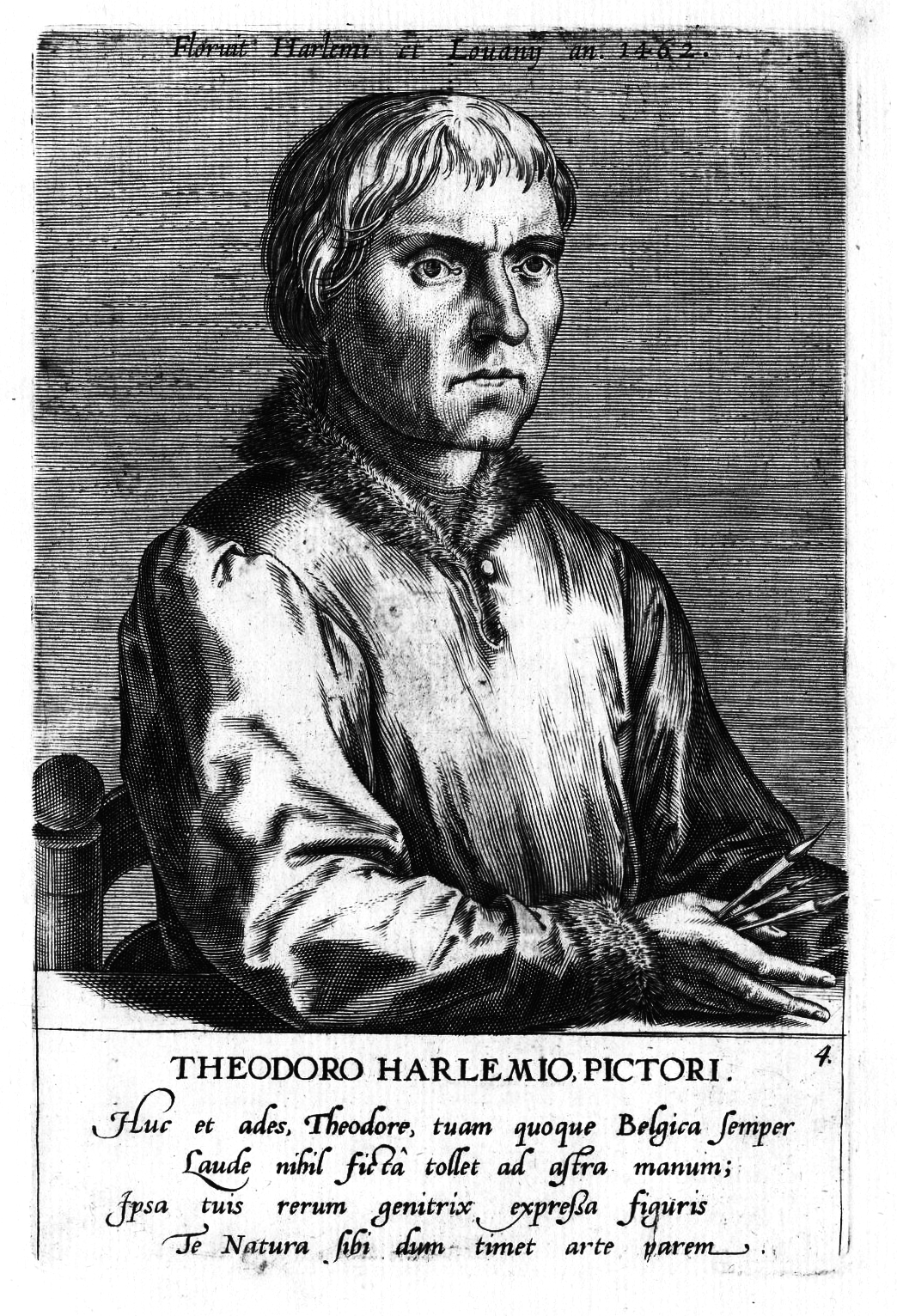
- Portrait engraving of Bouts
- Born: c. 1415; Haarlem, County of Holland, Holy Roman Empire
- Died: 6 May 1475 (aged 59–60); Leuven, Valois Burgundy
- Education: Rogier van der Weyden (possibly)
- Known for: Painting
- Movement: Early Netherlandish painting, Northern Renaissance

Dieric Bouts (Note: According to Karel van Mander in his Het Schilderboeck of 1604, Bouts was born in Haarlem and was mainly active in Leuven (Louvain), where he was city painter from 1468. Van Mander confused the issue by writing biographies of both "Dieric of Haarlem" and "Dieric of Leuven," although he was referring to the same artist. The similarity last names led to the confusion of Bouts with Hubrecht Stuerbout, a prominent sculptor in Leuven.) (born c. 1415 – 6 May 1475) was an Early Netherlandish painter. Bouts may have studied under Rogier van der Weyden, and his work was influenced by van der Weyden and Jan van Eyck. He worked in Leuven from 1457 (or possibly earlier) until his death in 1475. His name also appears at various museums and institutions as Dirk Bouts.

Bouts was among the first northern painters to demonstrate the use of a single vanishing point (as illustrated in his Last Supper).

== Works ==
=== Early works (before 1464) ===
Bouts' earliest work is the Triptych of the Virgin's Life in the Prado (Madrid), dated about 1445. The Deposition Altarpiece in Granada (Capilla Real) probably also dates to this period, around 1450–1460. A dismembered canvas altarpiece—now in the Royal Museums of Fine Arts of Belgium (Brussels), the J. Paul Getty Museum (Los Angeles), National Gallery (London), Norton Simon Museum (Pasadena), and a Swiss private collection—with the same dimensions as the Altarpiece of the Holy Sacrament may belong to this period. The Louvre Lamentation (Pietà) is another early work.

=== Documented works ===
The Last Supper is the central panel of Altarpiece of the Holy Sacrament, commissioned from Bouts by the Leuven Confraternity of the Holy Sacrament in 1464. All of the central room's orthogonals (lines imagined to be behind and perpendicular to the picture plane that converge at a vanishing point) lead to a single vanishing point in the centre of the mantelpiece above Christ's head. However the small side room has its own vanishing point, and neither it nor the vanishing point of the main room falls on the horizon of the landscape seen through the windows. The Last Supper is the second dated work (after Petrus Christus' Virgin and Child Enthroned with St. Jerome and St. Francis in Frankfurt, dated 1457) to display an understanding of Italian linear perspective.

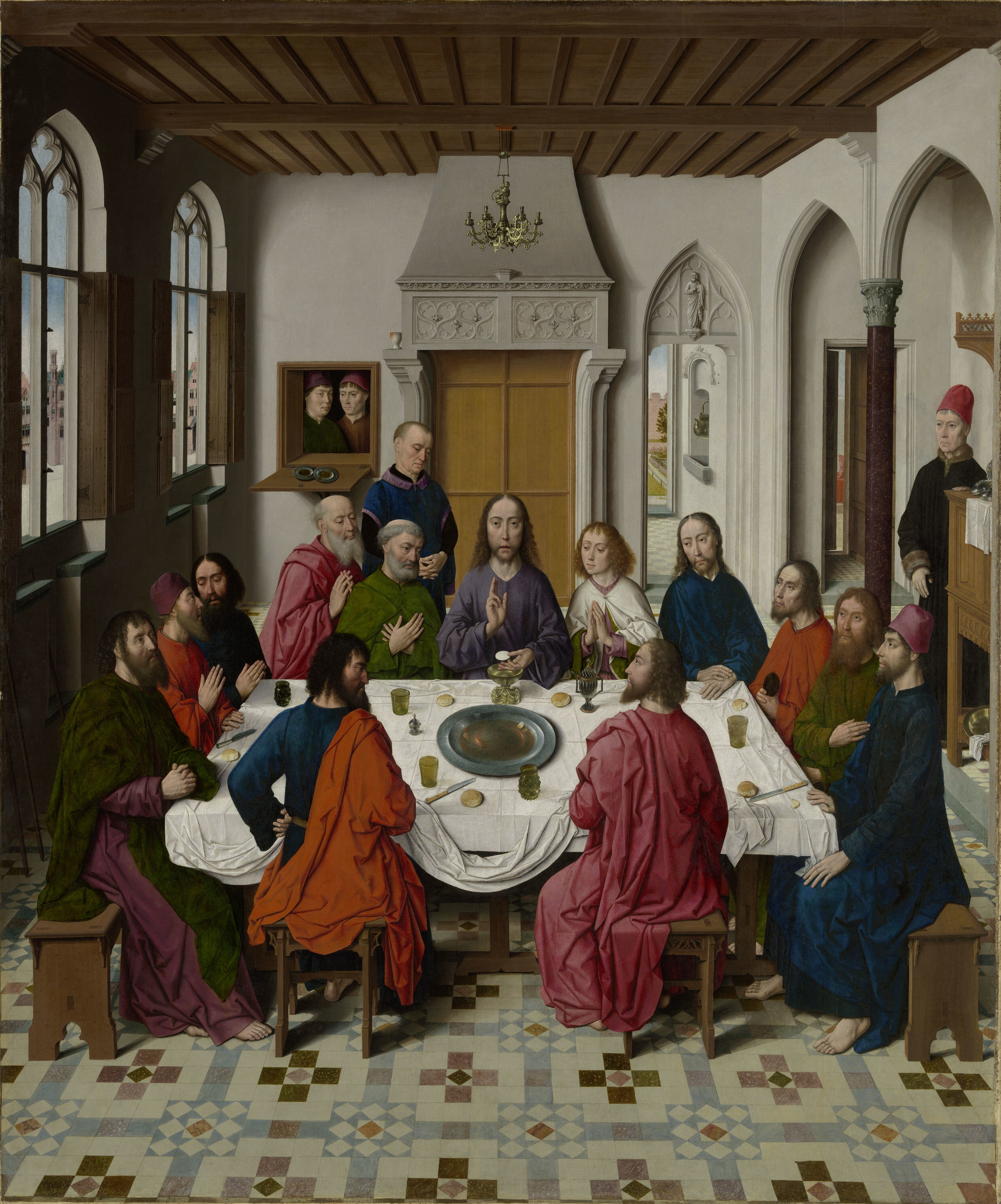
Last Supper, 1464–1467

Scholars also have noted that Bouts' Last Supper was the first Flemish panel painting to depict the Last Supper. In this central panel, Bouts did not focus on the biblical narrative itself but instead presented Christ in the role of a priest performing the consecration of the Eucharistic host from the Catholic Mass. This contrasts strongly with other Last Supper depictions, which often focused on Judas's betrayal or on Christ's comforting of John. Bouts also added to the complexity of this image by including four servants (two in the window and two standing), all dressed in Flemish attire. Although once identified as the artist himself and his two sons, these servants are most likely portraits of the confraternity's members responsible for commissioning the altarpiece. The Last Supper was the central part of the altarpiece in the St. Peter's Church, Leuven.

The Altarpiece of the Holy Sacrament has four additional panels, two on each side. Because these were taken to the museums in Berlin and Munich in the 19th century, the reconstruction of the original altarpiece has been difficult. Today it is thought that the panel with Abraham and Melchizedek is above the Passover Feast on the left wing, while the Gathering of the Manna is above Elijah and the Angel on the right wing. All of these are typological precursors to the Last Supper in the central panel.

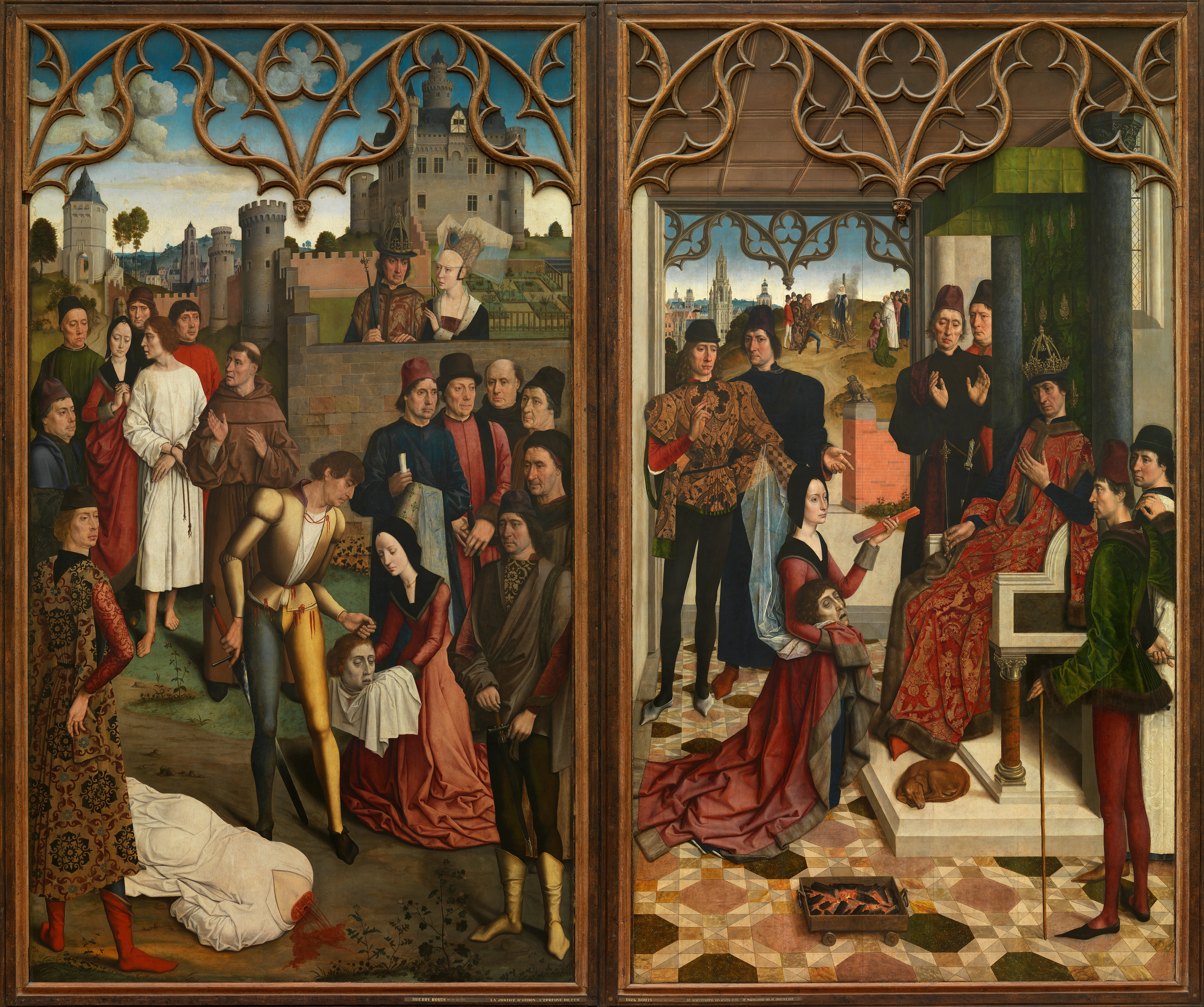
Justice of Emperor Otto III, 1471–1475, Museums of Fine Arts of Belgium, Brussels.

After attaining the rank of city painter of Leuven in 1468, Bouts received a commission to paint two more works for the Town Hall. The first was an altarpiece of the Last Judgment (1468–1470), which exists today only in the two wings with the Road to Paradise and The Fall of the Damned in the Musée des Beaux-Arts, Lille (France), and a fragmentary Bust of Christ from the central panel in the Nationalmuseum, Stockholm. After this, he turned to the larger commission for the Justice Panels (1470–1475), which occupied him until his death in 1475. He completed one panel and began a second, both depicting the life of the 11th-century Holy Roman Emperor Otto III. These pieces can now be seen in the Brussels Museum. The remaining two Justice panels were never completed.

=== Devotional panels and portraits ===
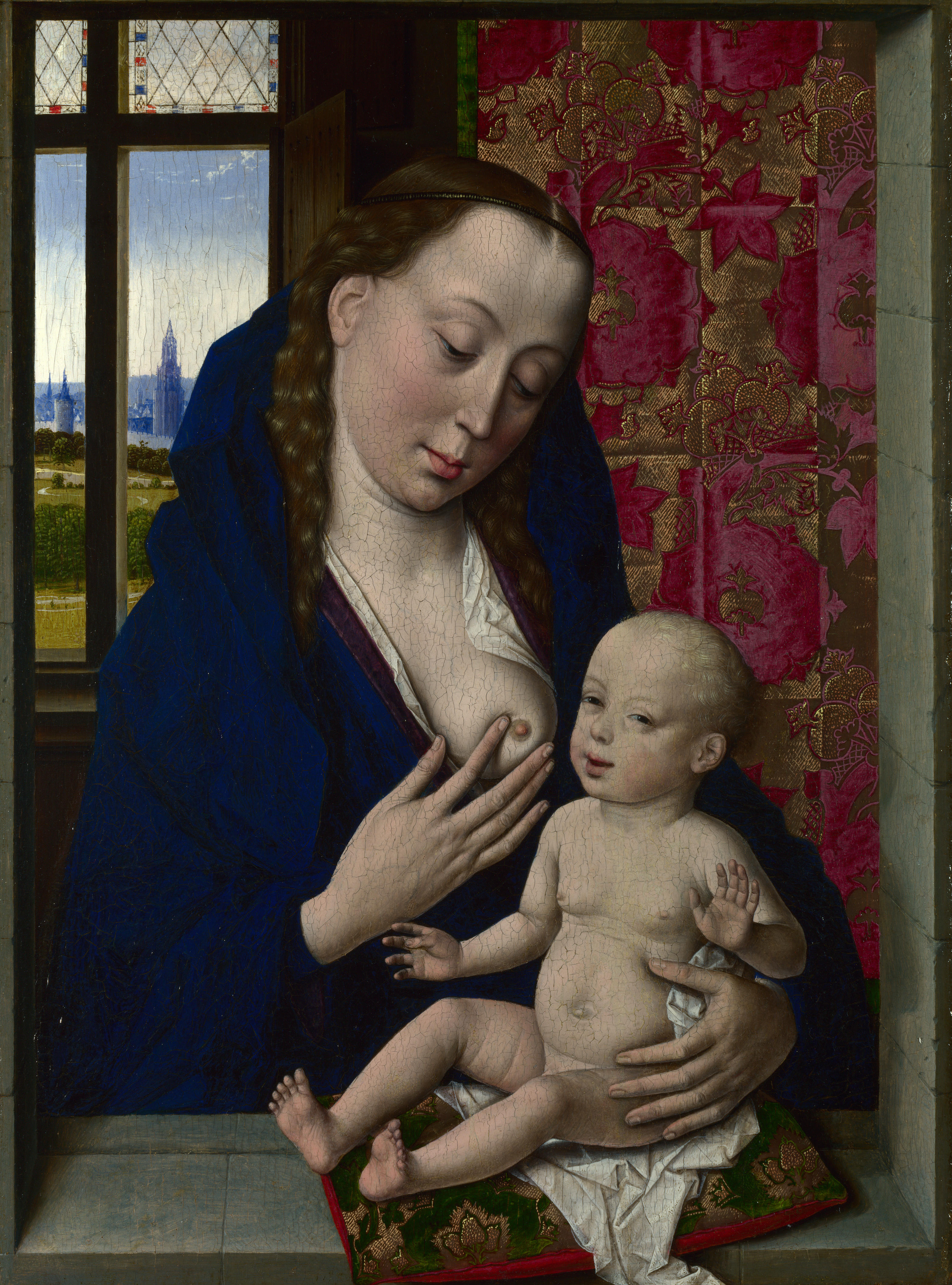
The Virgin and Child (c. 1465), National Gallery, London

Many of Bouts' authentic works are small devotional panels, usually of the Virgin and Child. An early example is the Davis Madonna in New York (Metropolitan Museum of Art), excellent copies of which exist in the Bargello in Florence and the Fine Arts Museums of San Francisco. This composition follows the formula of the miraculous icon of Notre-Dame-des-Grâces, which was installed in the cathedral of Cambrai (France) in 1454. The Virgin and Child in the National Gallery (London) is the largest and most ambitious of these Marian pictures.

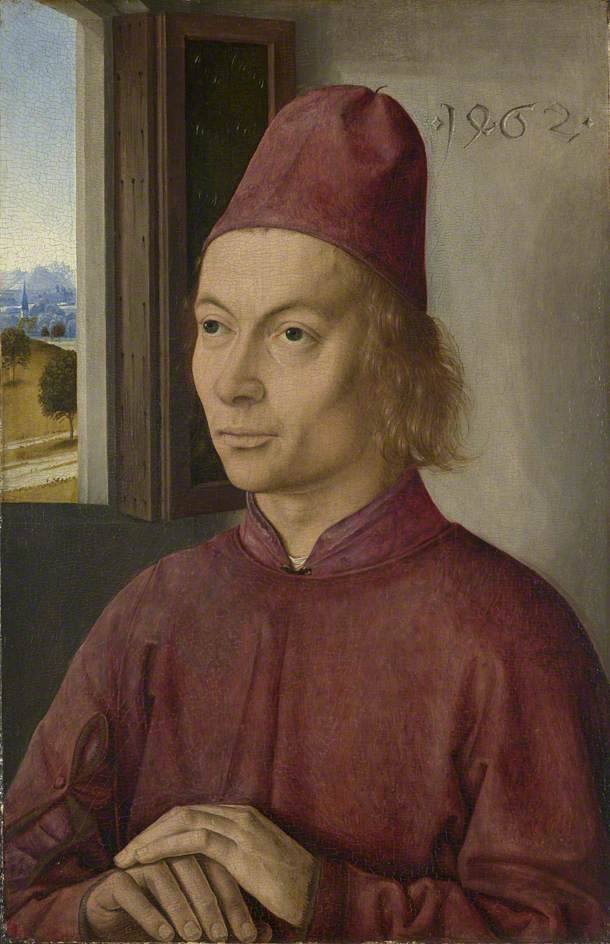
Portrait of a Man (Jan van Winckele?) (1462), National Gallery, London

In the realm of portraiture, Bouts expanded upon the tradition established by Robert Campin, Jan van Eyck, Rogier van der Weyden, and Petrus Christus. His 1462 Portrait of a Man in the National Gallery (London) is the first instance of a sitter shown in three-quarter view before a discernible background with a glimpse of the landscape out the window. Also widely attributed to Bouts is the Portrait of a Man in the Metropolitan Museum of Art (New York), which resembles some of the figures in the artist's late Justice Panels of 1470–1475. Other portraits associated with Bouts, such as those in Washington (National Gallery of Art) and Antwerp (Royal Museum of Fine Arts), are more problematic.

=== Other works ===
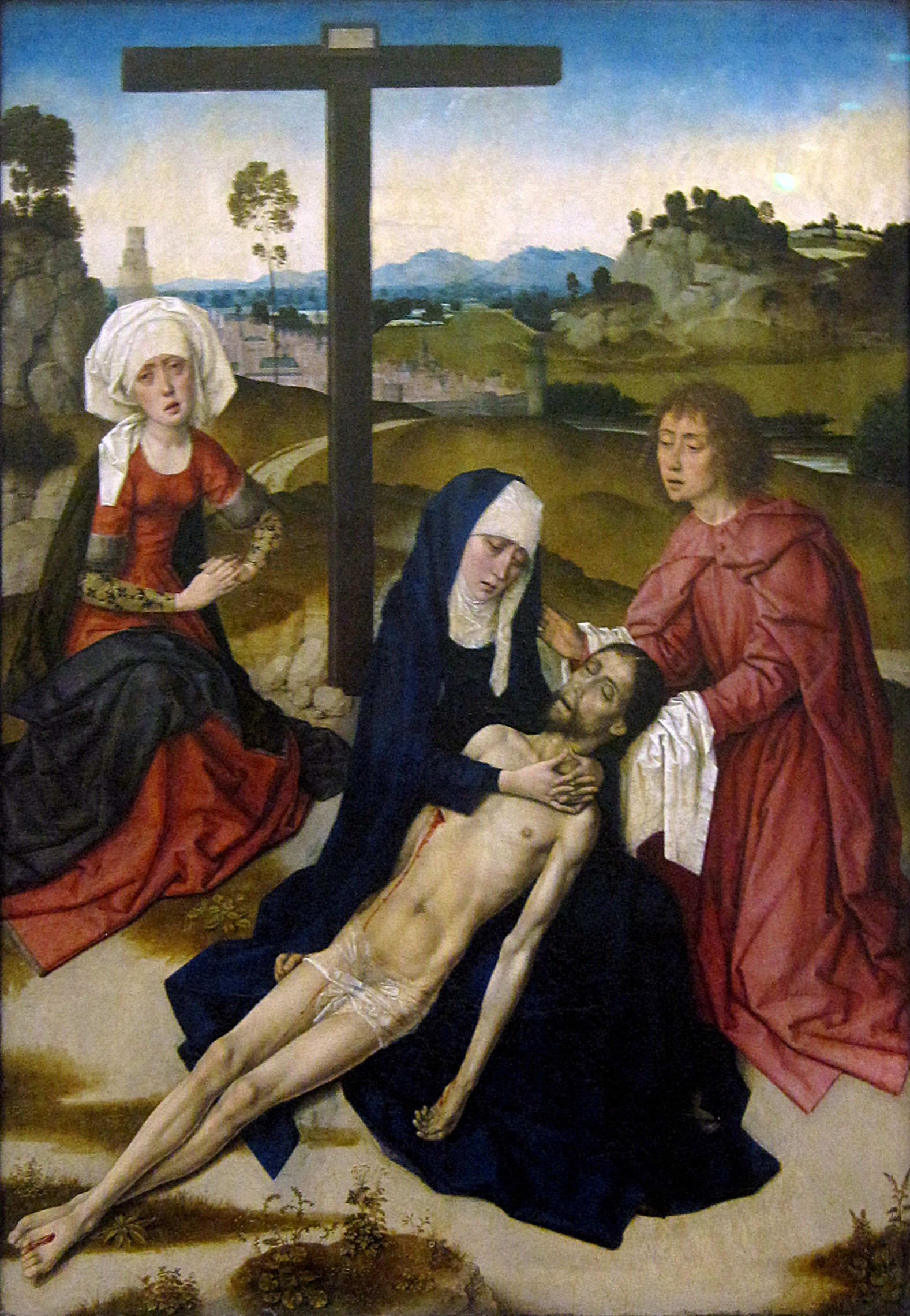
Lamentation, c. 1455-1460. Louvre

The Last Supper and Justice Panels are the only works known to be definitely done by Bouts. The remaining panels from the Last Judgment Altarpiece (datable to 1468–1470) and the triptych The Martyrdom of St Erasmus (before 1466) are also fairly secure attributions. Aside from these, a number of other paintings have been attributed to him.

These are: Christ in the House of Simon, Christ in the House of Simon and Nativity fragment with the Virgin at Prayer in the Staatliche Museen. The triptych the Martyrdom of St. Hippolytus (Groeningemuseum), Virgin Enthroned with Four Angels (Capilla Real, Granada), and an Annunciation (Museu Calouste Gulbenkian, Lisbon). The National Gallery holds The Entombment, the Virgin Enthroned with St. Peter and St. Paul, and The Virgin and Child.

Others are Saint James the Greater (Museu de Arte Sacra do Funchal, Madeira, Portugal), Ecce Agnus Dei, (Alte Pinakothek), Moses before the Burning Bush (Philadelphia Museum of Art), Bust of Christ (Museum Boijmans Van Beuningen), Virgin and Child (National Gallery of Art, Washington), and a Resurrection in the Norton Simon Museum of Art. Two are in the Louvre – a Nativity fragment with St. Joseph and the Virgin and Child Enthroned in a Niche.

Two Boutsian works in the Alte Pinakothek in Munich have perplexed art historians. One is the so-called Pearl of Brabant triptych, which writers as early as 1902 tried to separate from Bouts' authentic works. Recent research seems to refute this attempt. The other is a pair of panels from an altarpiece depicting the Passion, respectively showing the Betrayal of Christ and the Resurrection. For a long time these were considered some of Bouts' earliest works, but dendrochronological evidence now places them around the time of his death in 1475. Schone's 1938 invention of a "Master of the Munich Betrayal" is a more appropriate attribution.

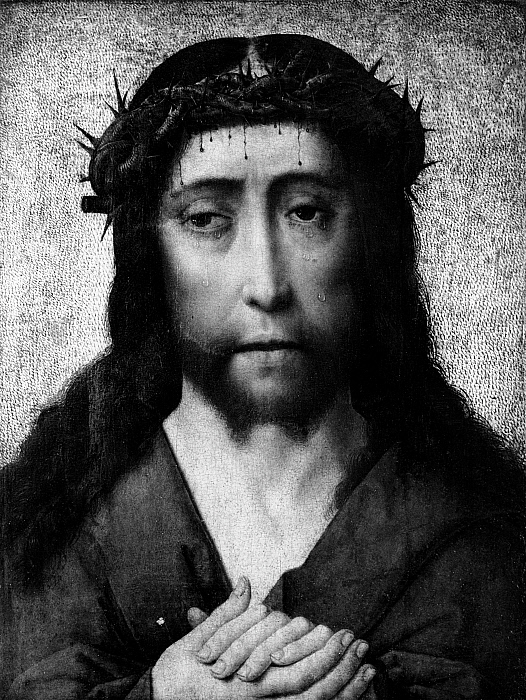
Christ Crowned with Thorns (Ecce Homo) (1458–1475), tempera with oil highlights on panel, Clark Art Institute

== Family ==
Bouts was married twice and had four children. One of his weddings was in Leuven about 1447. His two daughters went to convents, and his two sons became painters who carried the Bouts workshop into the mid-16th century. Little is known of the elder son, Dieric the Younger, although he appears to have continued in his father's style until his early death in 1491. The younger brother, Aelbrecht (or Albert), did likewise, but in a style that is unmistakably his own. His distinctive work propelled Boutsian imagery into the 16th century.

== Exhibition Dieric Bouts, Creator of Images ==
In 2023, the museum of Leuven (Belgium), organised a retrospective exhibition on the work of Bouts, entitled Dieric Bouts, Creator of Images, under the direction of Peter Carpreau. The main themes in the exhibition were Bouts's devotional work, his landscape painting, the use of perspective and the beauty of the banal in his paintings. Specific to this exhibition was the link made between Bouts' work and today's visual culture.
