= Altarpiece of the Holy Sacrament =

Triptych by Dieric Bouts

Triptych: The Last Supper
- Five panel altar: The gathering of manna (recto top), Elijah awakened by the angel (1 Kings 19:5-6) (recto bottom), The last supper (middle), The meeting of Abraham and Melchizedek (verso top) and the Feast of Passover (verso bottom), Dutch: Triptiek van het Heilig Sacrament (Het Laatste Avondmaal)
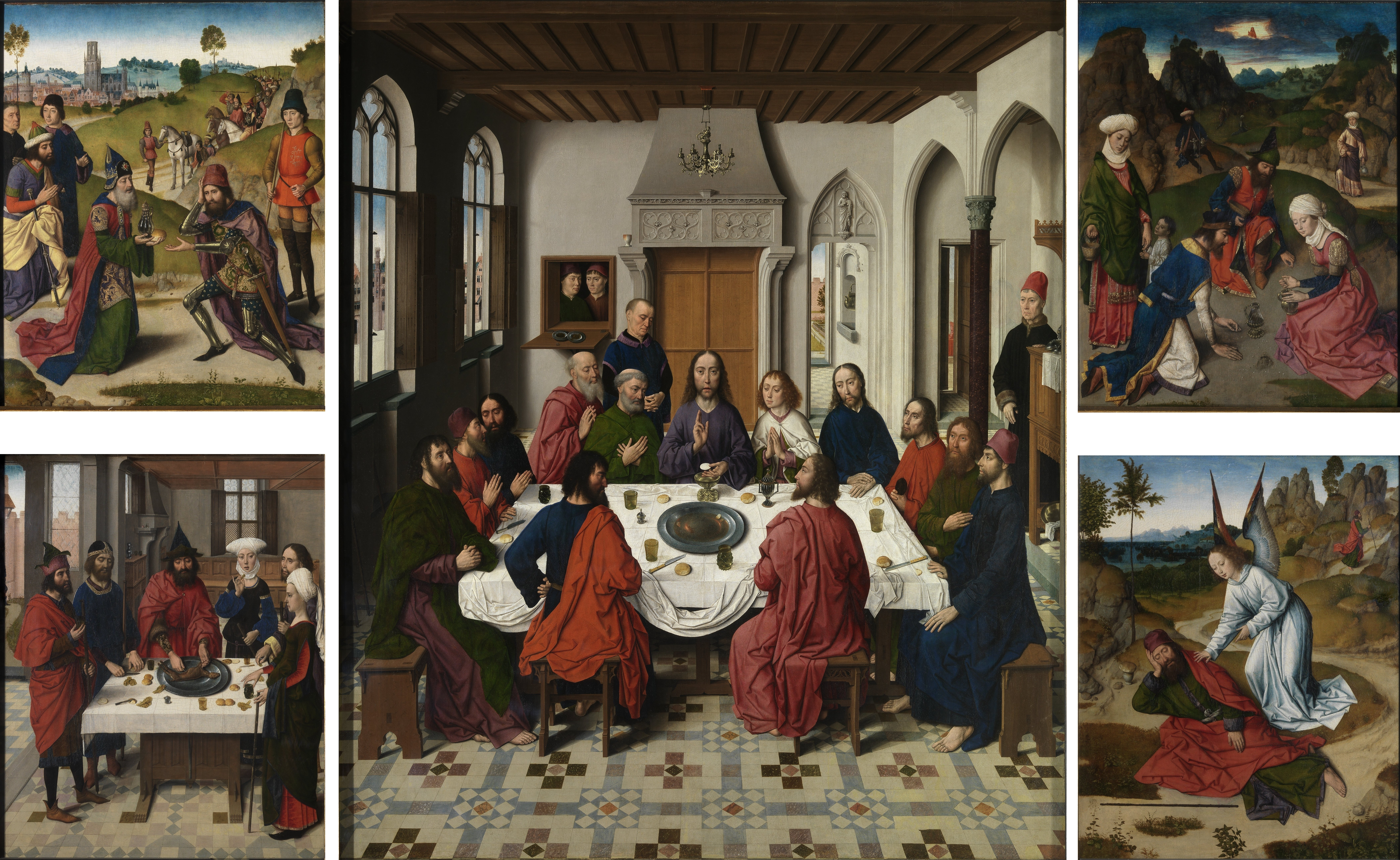
- Artist: Dieric Bouts
- Year: 1464–1468
- Medium: Oil paint, panel
- Movement: Early Netherlandish painting
- Dimensions: 88, 183 cm (35, 72 in) × 71, 152.5 cm (28.0, 60.0 in)
- Location: St. Peter's Church, Leuven, 50.87940800114614, 4.7018351412256605
- Collection: Saint Peter's Church, M – Museum Leuven
- Accession no.: S/58/B
- Identifiers: RKDimages ID: 216141
- Website: https://www.mleuven.be/en/even-more-m/last-supper

Altarpiece of the Blessed Sacrament or Triptych of the Last Supper is a 1464–1468 dated folding triptych with at least five panel paintings attributed to the Flemish painter Dieric Bouts, now reassembled and held at its location of origin in the eastern choir chapel of St. Peter's Church, Leuven, Belgium.

== Description ==
Max Friedländer describes the altarpiece as "a central panel showing the Last Supper ... and four other pictures, which make up the insides of the shutters, in tiers of two. At one time, these shutter presumably carried paintings on the outside as well, but of these nothing is preserved."

The New Testament scene of the Last Supper is the theme of the central panel of the altarpiece, commissioned from Bouts by the Leuven Confraternity of the Holy Sacrament in 1464 and constitutes what Maruits Smeyers names the artist's "magnum opus." The orthogonal lines in the composition express the artist's strong understanding of linear perspective. The lines lead to a single vanishing point in the center of the mantelpiece above Christ's head. Though outside the room, the small side room has its own vanishing point, and neither it nor the vanishing point of the main room falls on the horizon of the landscape seen through the windows.

The four surrounding panels interpret Old Testament scenes with elements of food that each anticipate the Gospels' Last Supper: Feast of Passover, Elijah in the wilderness, Abraham Welcoming Melchizedek, and the Gathering of Manna.

== Artist and commission ==
Dieric Bouts was not a native of Leuven. He moved there from Haarlem and his Last Supper was the first Flemish panel painting of its kind. In this central panel, Bouts introduced the idea of a group portrait around a table, a theme known to council members in Haarlem. Christ is depicted larger than life in the role of a priest performing the consecration of the Eucharistic host from the Catholic Mass. The men around him are shown a half-size smaller, and probably are accurate portraits of prominent members of the confraternity. Bouts was not the only artist traveling between Haarlem and Leuven. While Bouts was working on this triptych, the church was still under construction under the supervision of members of the Keldermans family of architects, sculptors and masons.

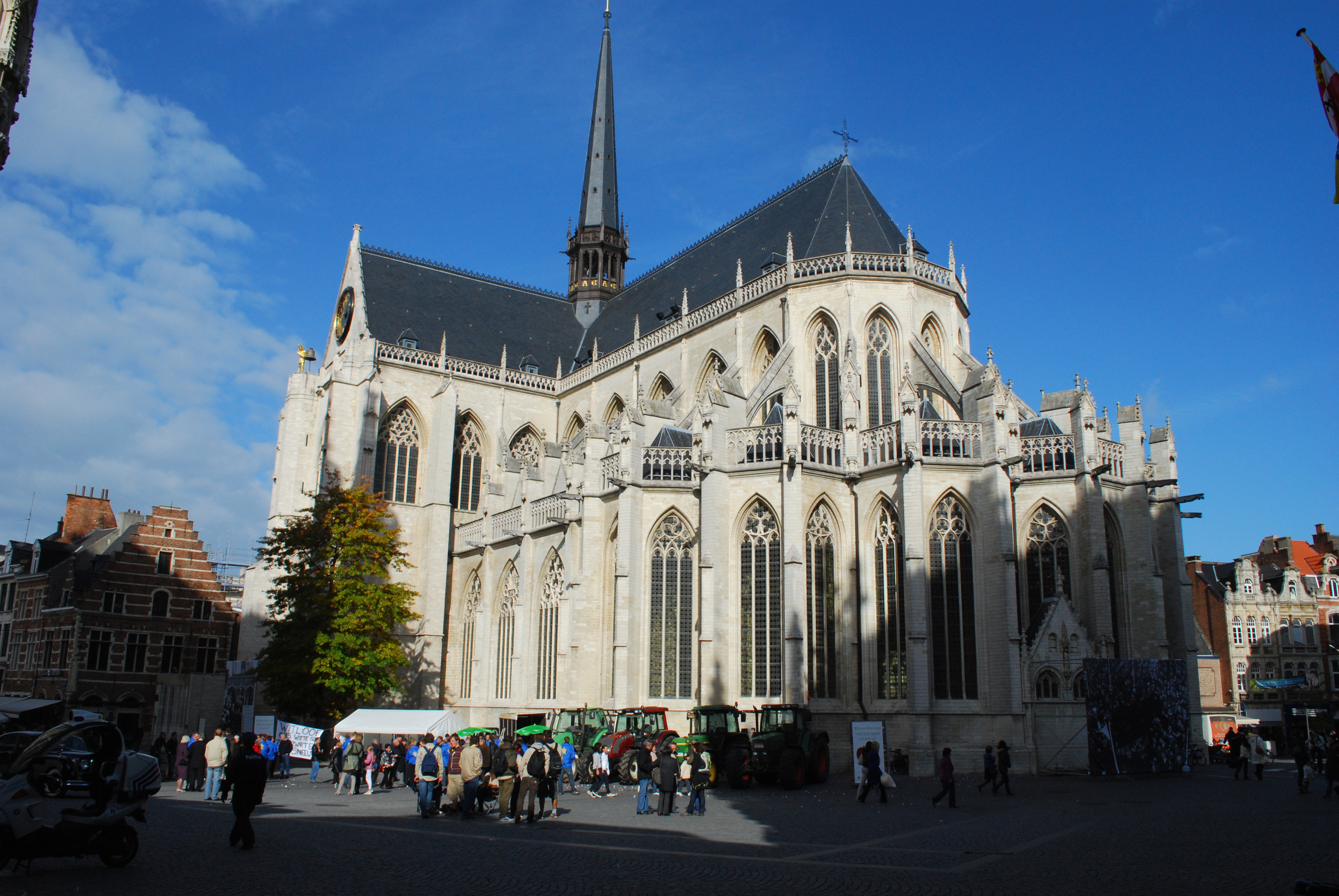
St. Peter's in Leuven seen from the southwest

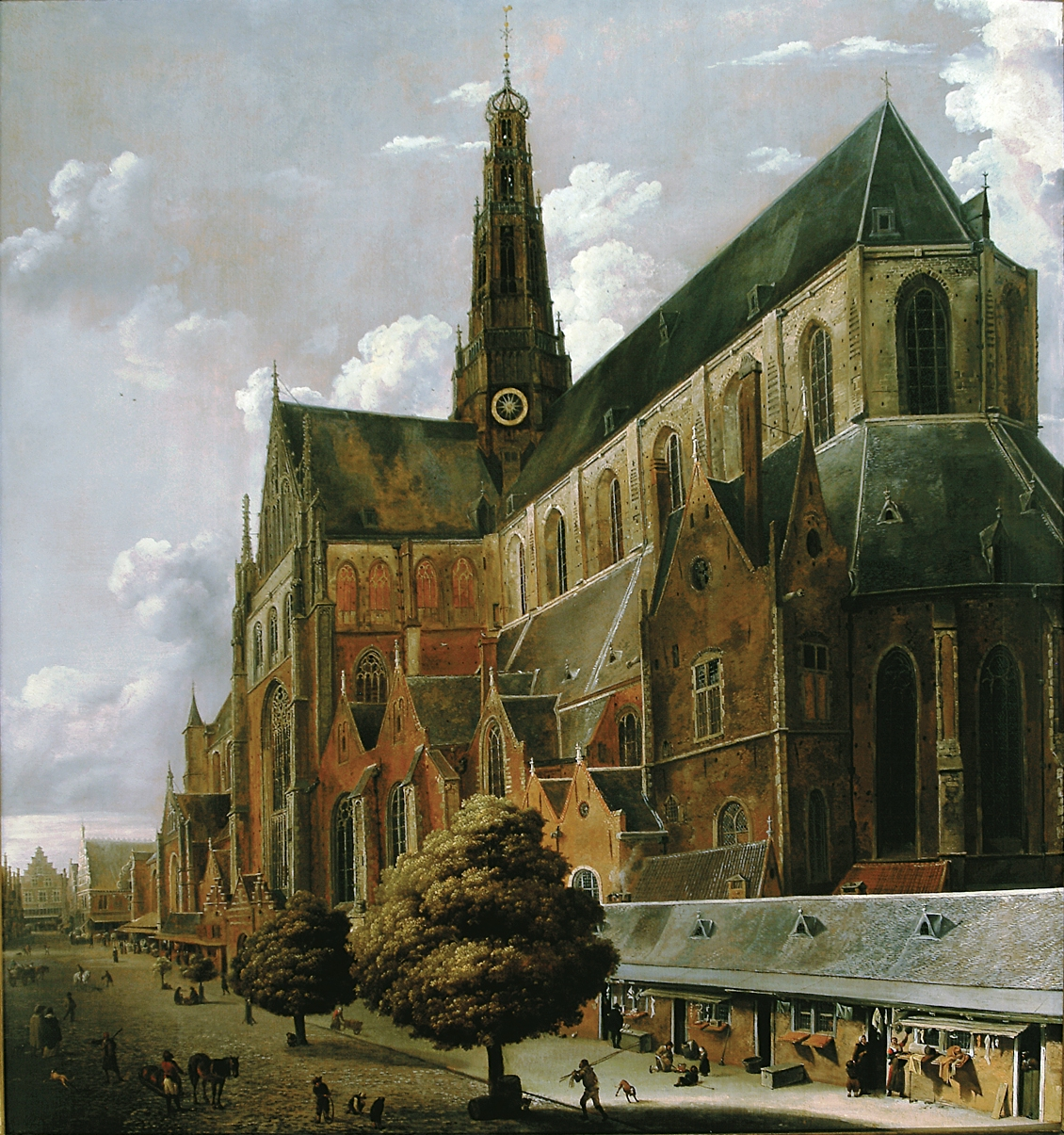
St. Bavo's in Haarlem seen from the southwest

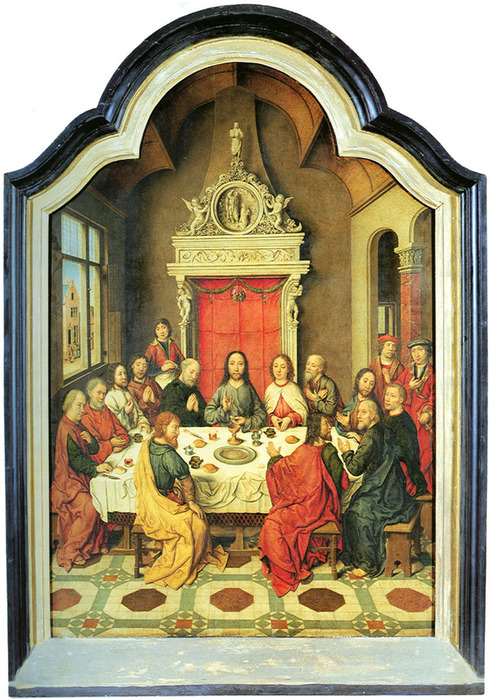
Last Supper by Aelbrecht Bouts, c. 1530

Bouts' main contribution to Flemish painting was his introduction of everyday details in the main panel such as the houses on the other side of the market square that can be seen through the windows, and the servants dressed in modern clothing beyond the central scene around the table. Although once identified as the artist himself and his two sons, these servants are most likely more portraits of the confraternity's members responsible for commissioning the altarpiece. This painting was copied by the artist's son, Aelbrecht Bouts, who disregarded the architectural elements through the windows, because by that time the church and the town square had changed. Leuven had built a new town hall, for which Dieric also began work on four large panel paintings as an allegory of Justice.

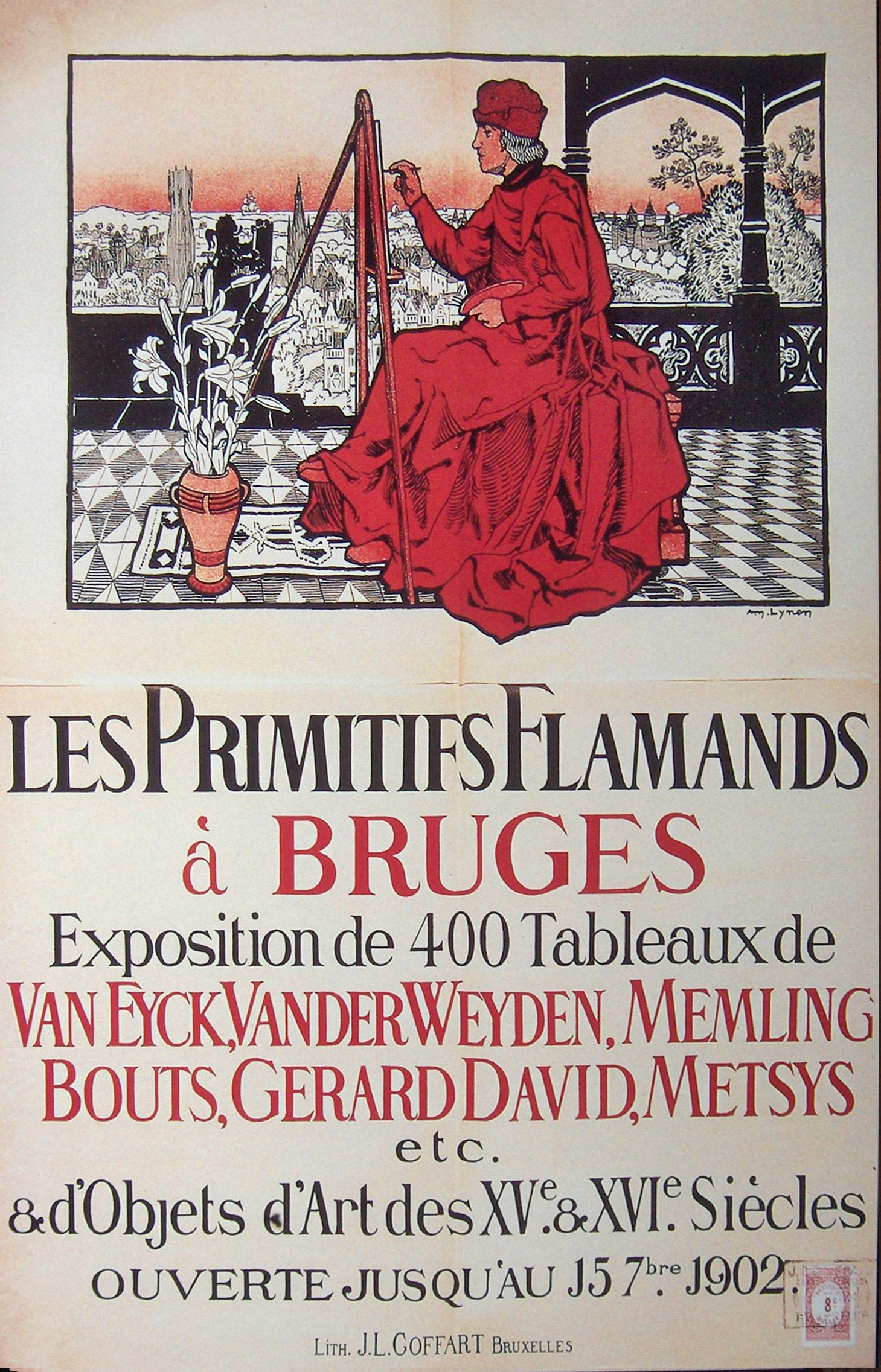
Poster for 1902 Bruges exhibition

Bouts arrived in Leuven around 1445, and would be named the town's official painter. A document attesting to the commission between the confraternity and the artist is dated 15 March 1464. The contract specified how the content of the pictures would be specified by theologians at the university in Leuven, and that each scene should contain the subject of "bread." A receipt for final payment is dated 9 February 1468. The documents remained in the archives of the church and were first published in 1898.

The work was documented by Leuven archivist Edward van Even in 1870, who lent it to his friend James Weale for the 1902 Exhibition of Flemish Primitives in Bruges. The panel has since been exhibited over a dozen times in Belgium, The Netherlands, the US, and France.

== Placement and disposition of the panels ==
The Altarpiece of the Holy Sacrament contains four additional panels, two each on each of the wings to either side of the central Last Supper. Because these four pictures were taken to the museums in Berlin and Munich in the 19th century, reconstruction of the disposition of the panels of original altarpiece has been difficult. In the 20th century, art historians believe the panel with Abraham and Melchizedek would have been placed above the Passover Feast on the left wing, while the Gathering of the Manna above Elijah and the Angel on the right wing. All of these show scenes that are taken as typological precursors to the Last Supper in the central panel.

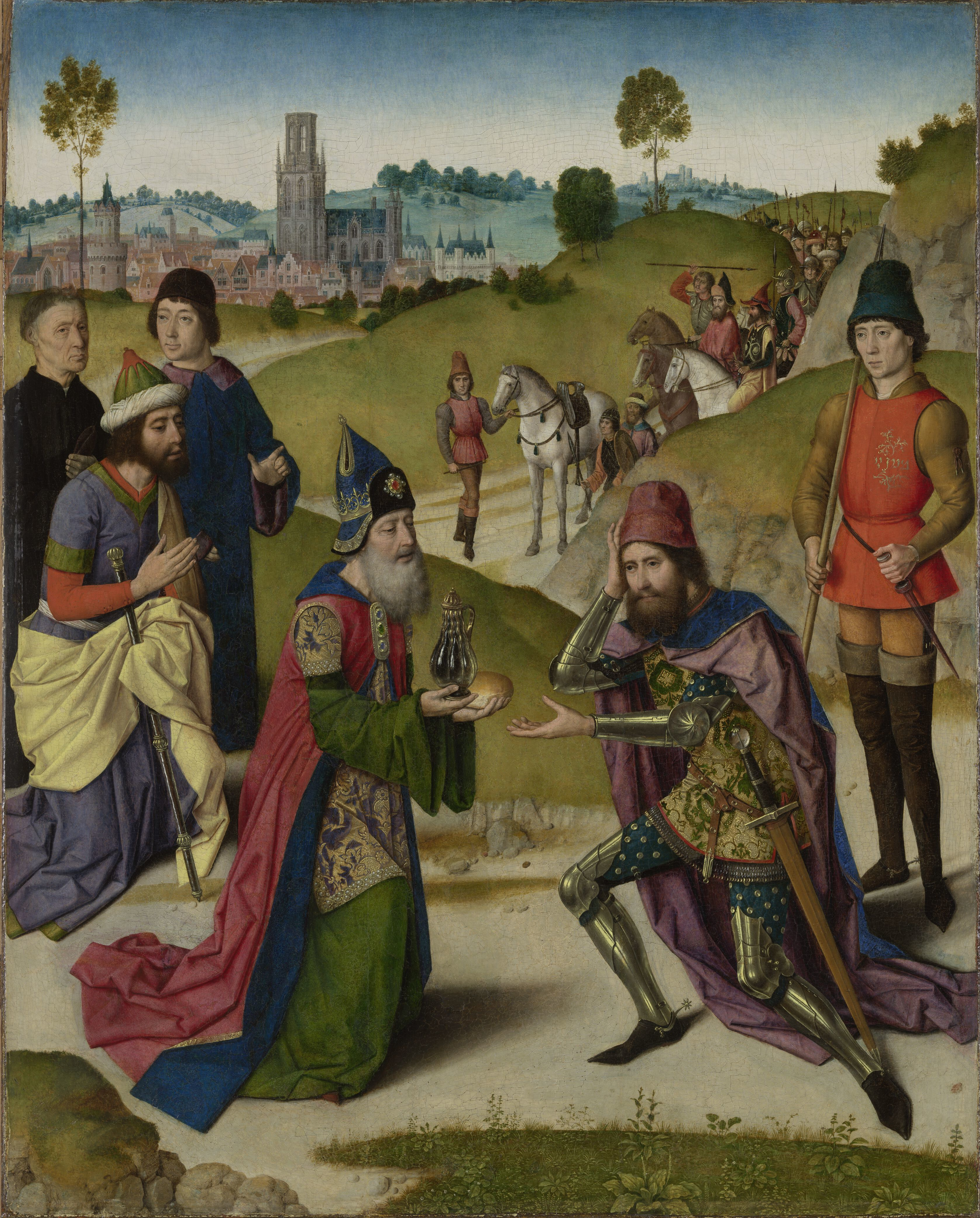
–Upper left door: Meeting of Abraham and Melchizadek

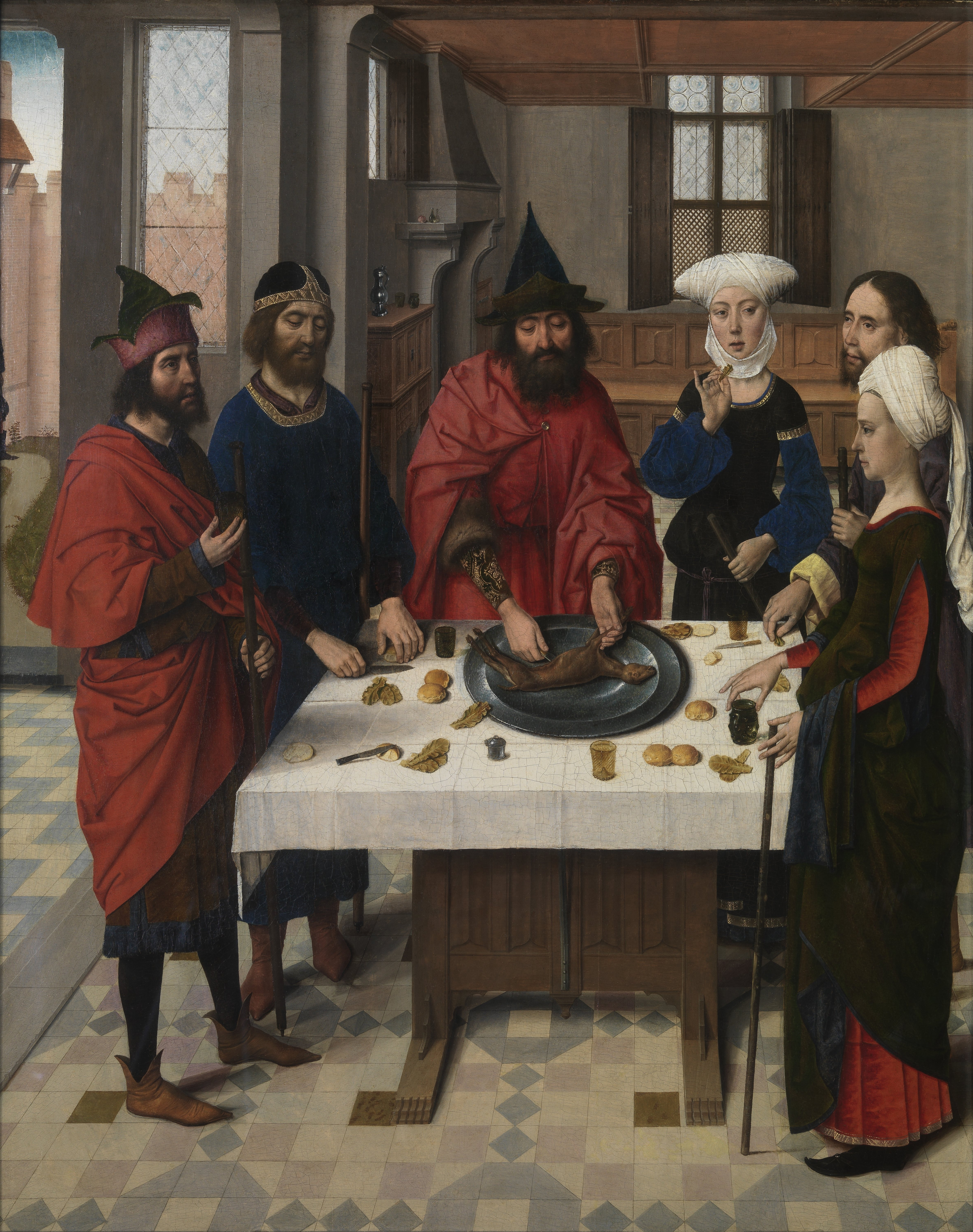
Lower left door: The Feast of the Passover

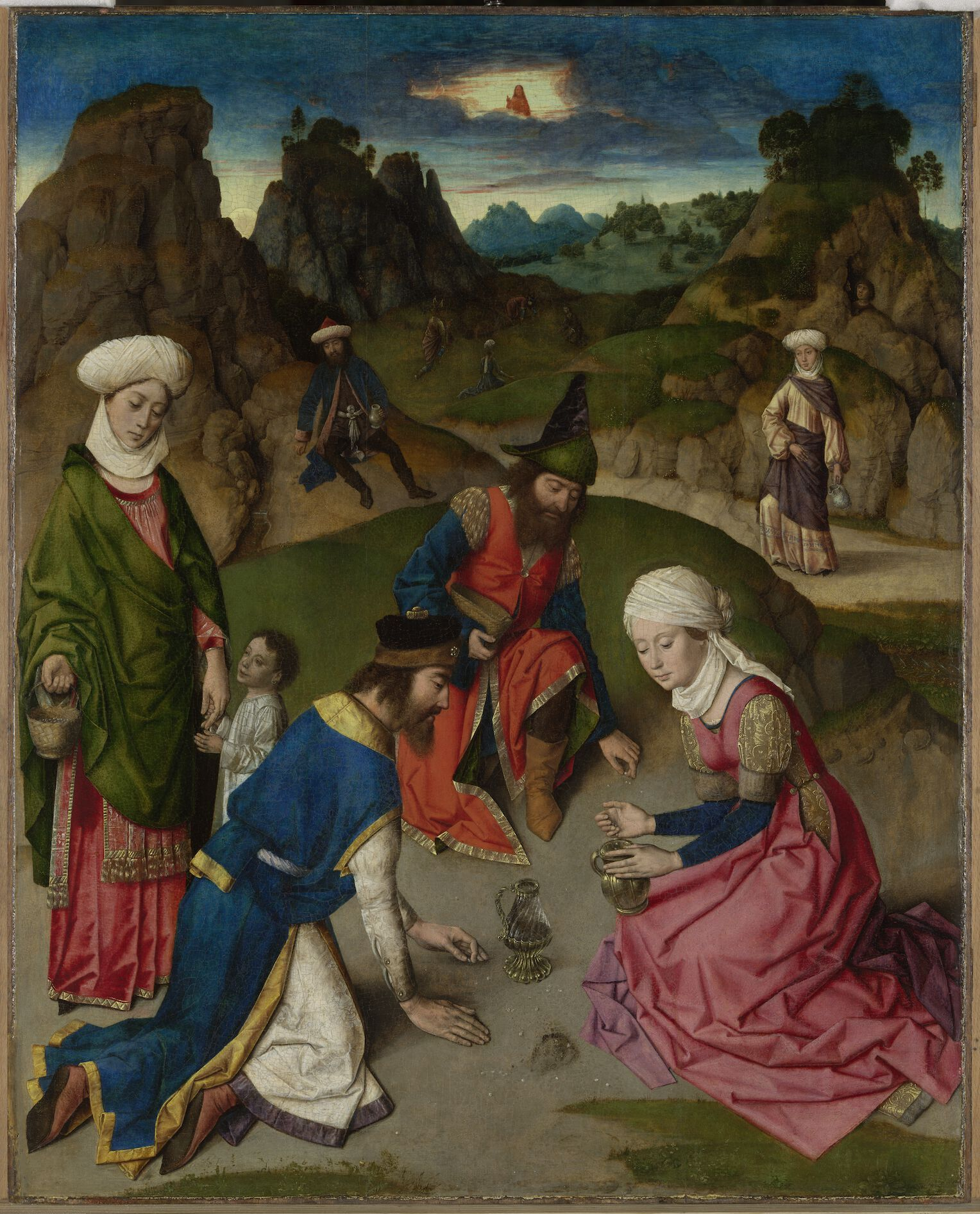
Upper right door: The Gathering of the Manna

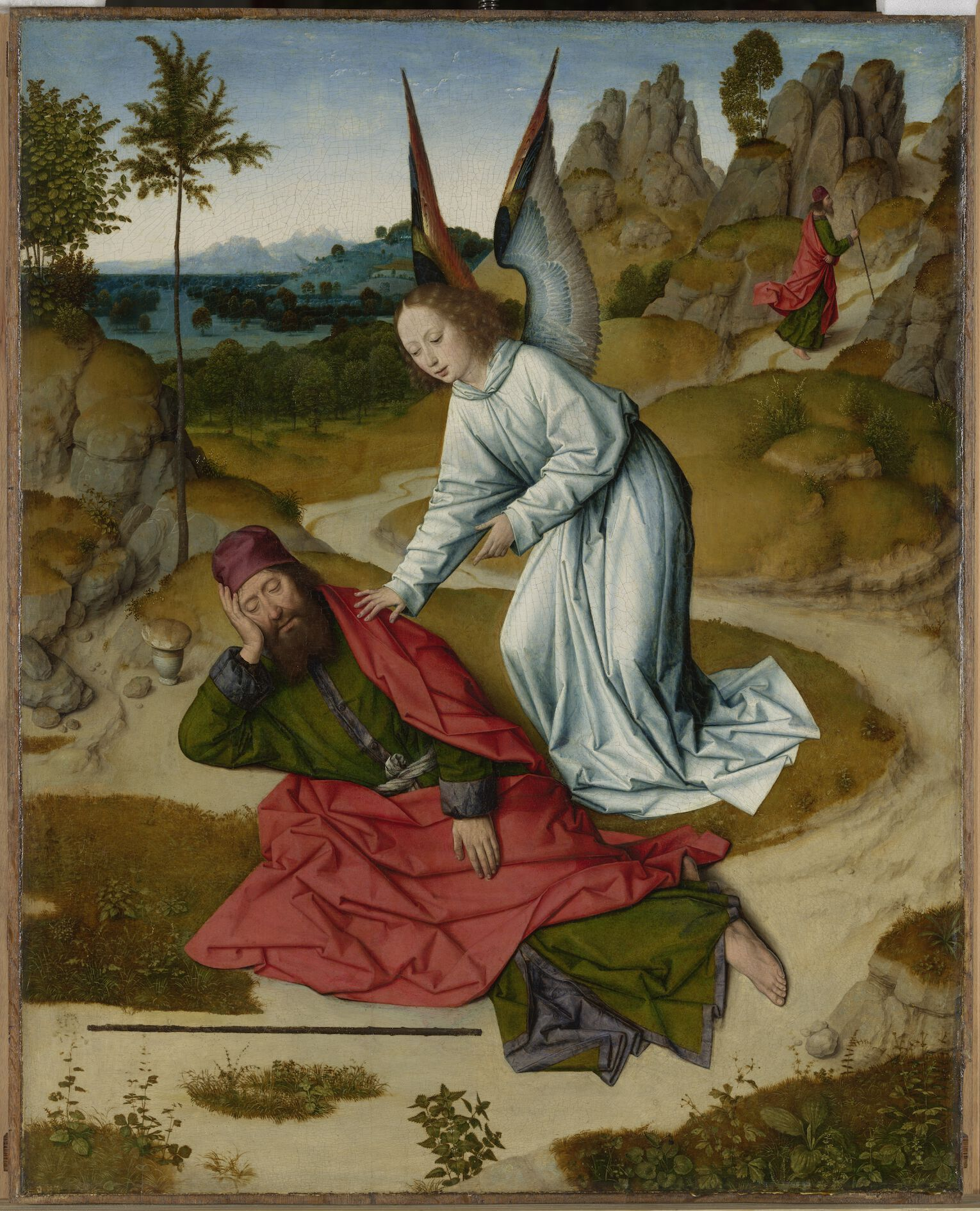
Lower right door: Prophet Elijah in the Desert

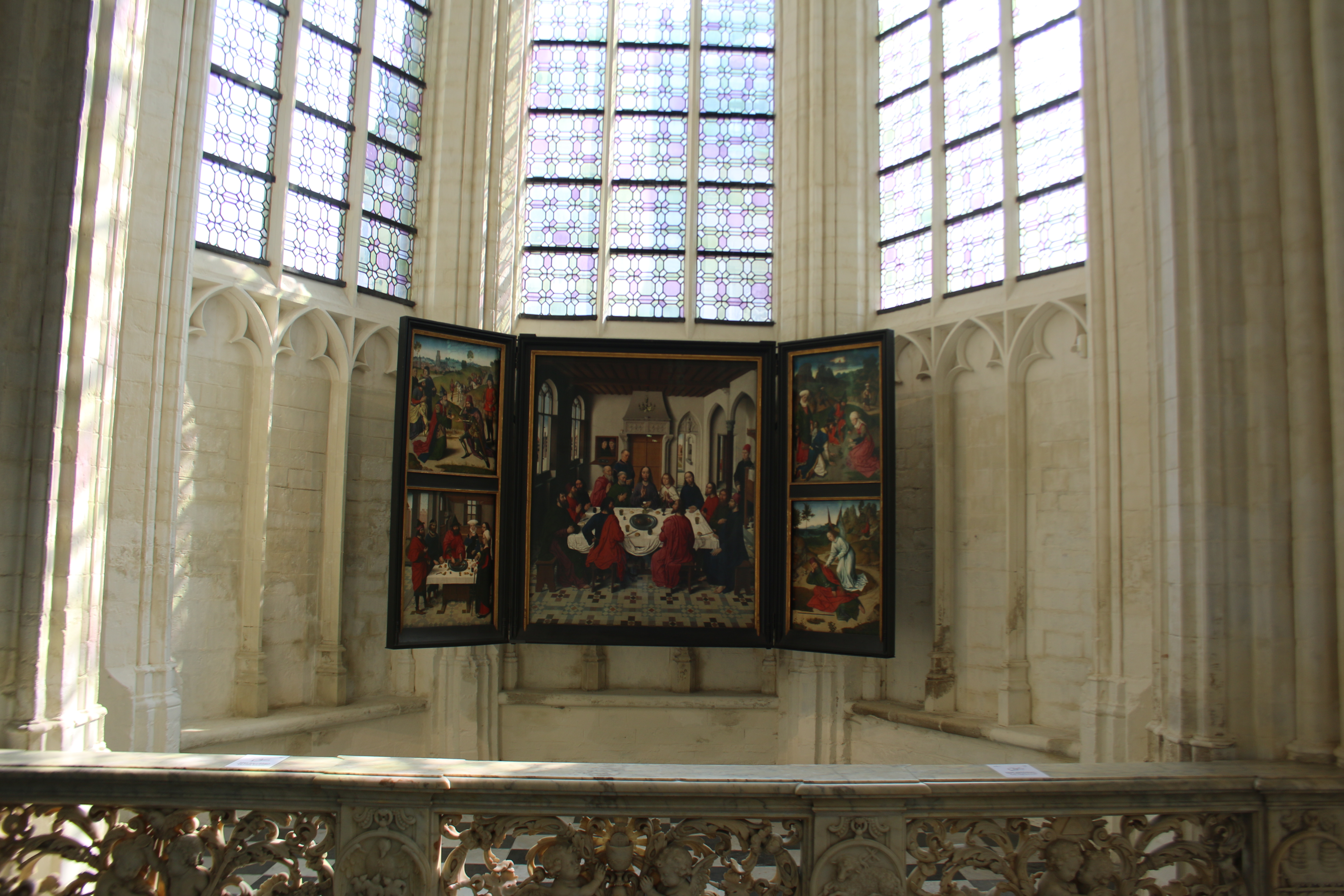
Panel in chapel, Saint Peter's Church, Leuven (photo from 2021)

Neighboring ambulatory chapels of the church contain two altarpiece paintings by Bouts—the Last Supper (1464–1468) and the Martyrdom of St Erasmus (c.1465), both commissioned by the Brotherhood of the Holy Sacrament, which owned the chapels.

While the central panel remained in the church, the wings around 1700 found their way to the Von Bettendor collection in Brussels, and then were taken to Aken. Later, the two upper panels from the set had been sold to Bavarian King Ludwig I in 1815, and the two lower panels to the Kaiser Friedrich Museum in Berlin in 1834. Germany was forced to return all the panels as part of the required reparations of the Versailles Treaty after World War I along with the Ghent Altarpiece. The Nazis seized the wings in 1942, which were then found by American forces in the complex of salt mines northwest of Altausee Austria in 1945—to be reconstituted and returned to the church in Leuven.

The chancel and ambulatory were turned into a museum in 1998, where visitors can view a collection of sculptures, paintings and metalwork. The paintings there are overseen and protected by the staff of the M Museum Leuven, but the outer panels of the Altarpiece of the Holy Sacrament are technically owned by the Belgian state.

The original altarpiece was dismantled in 1707, and the painted surface was transferred to boards in 1840. Scientific efforts were undertaken most recently in 1948 and 1996 to understand materials and technique, and to conserve and preserve the paintings.

The work was the subject of an exhibition by the artist Jill Magid at the M Museum Leuven in 2023, and it appeared in an exhibition devoted to Bouts there from October 2023 to January 2024.
