= The Fall of the Damned =

Painting by Peter Paul Rubens

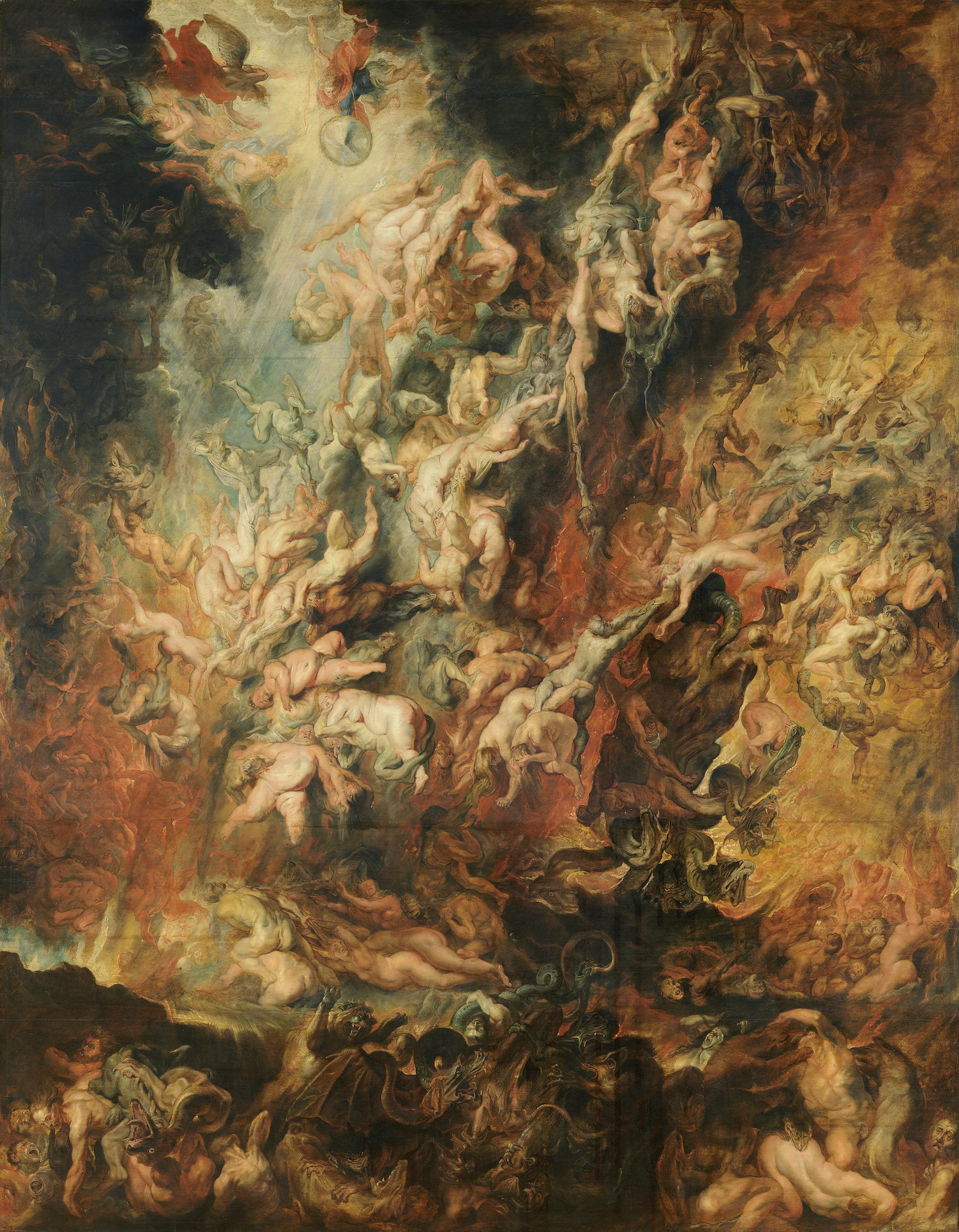
- Artist: Peter Paul Rubens
- Year: c. 1621
- Medium: Oil on panel
- Dimensions: 286.0 cm × 224.0 cm (112.60 in × 88.19 in)
- Location: Alte Pinakothek, Munich

The Fall of the Damned, alternately known as The Fall of the Rebel Angels, is a monumental religious painting by Peter Paul Rubens dated around 1620. It depicts a jumble of the bodies of the damned, hurled into the abyss by archangel Michael and accompanying angels.

In 1959, an art vandal threw acid on the painting. He said he did not directly destroy the work, as the acid "relieves one from the work of destruction."

== Sketch ==
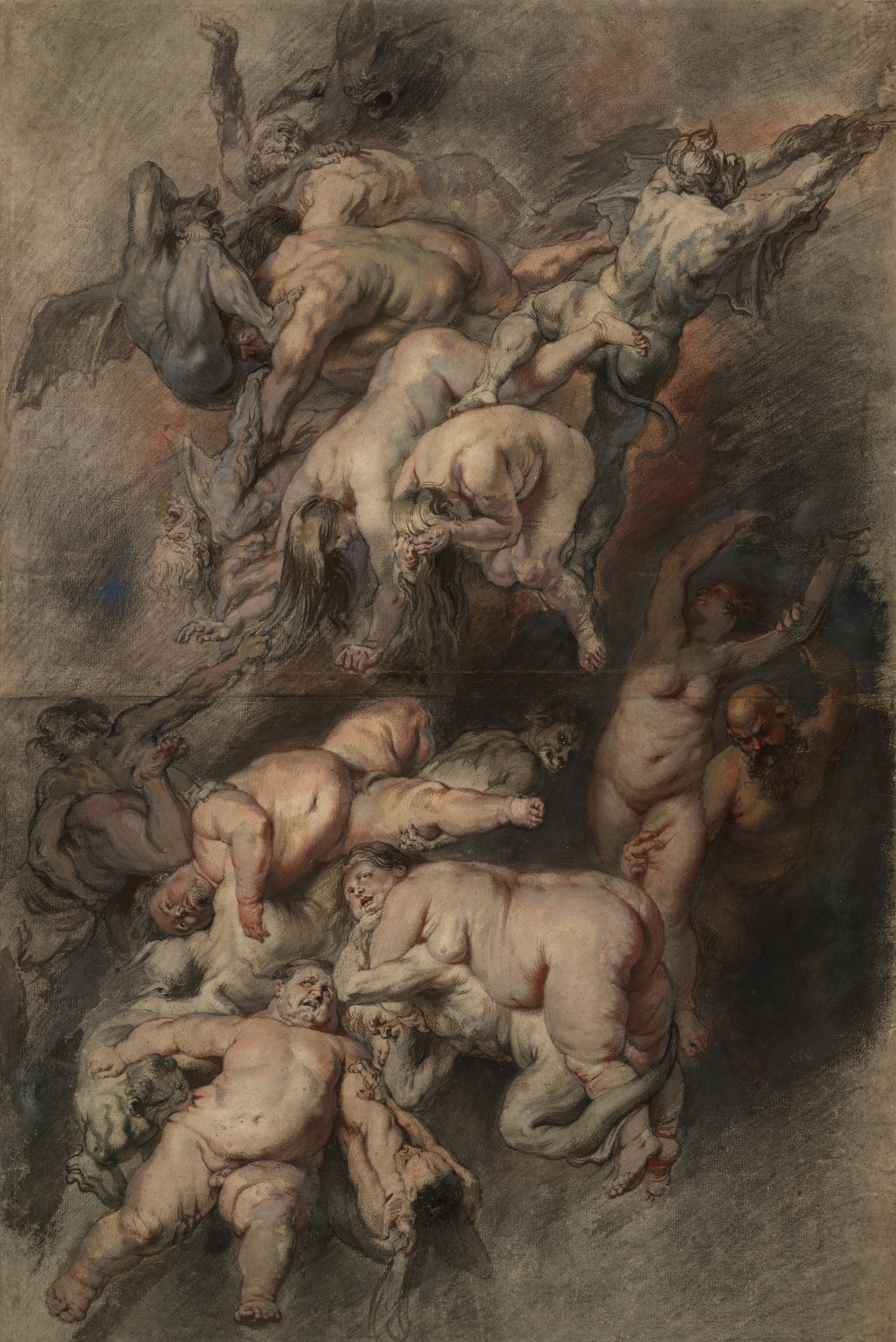
Study for The Fall of the Damned, c.1614–1618

The sketch of The Fall of the Damned was made in black and red chalks, with a grey wash and is kept in the British Museum. It is assumed to be the work of a studio assistant, which Rubens then went over with a brush and oil colour. The dramatic chiaroscuro of the human forms and clouds emphasizes the darkness into which these figures fall, far from the heavenly light above.
