= Nativity (Christus) =

Oil on wood panel painting by Petrus Christus

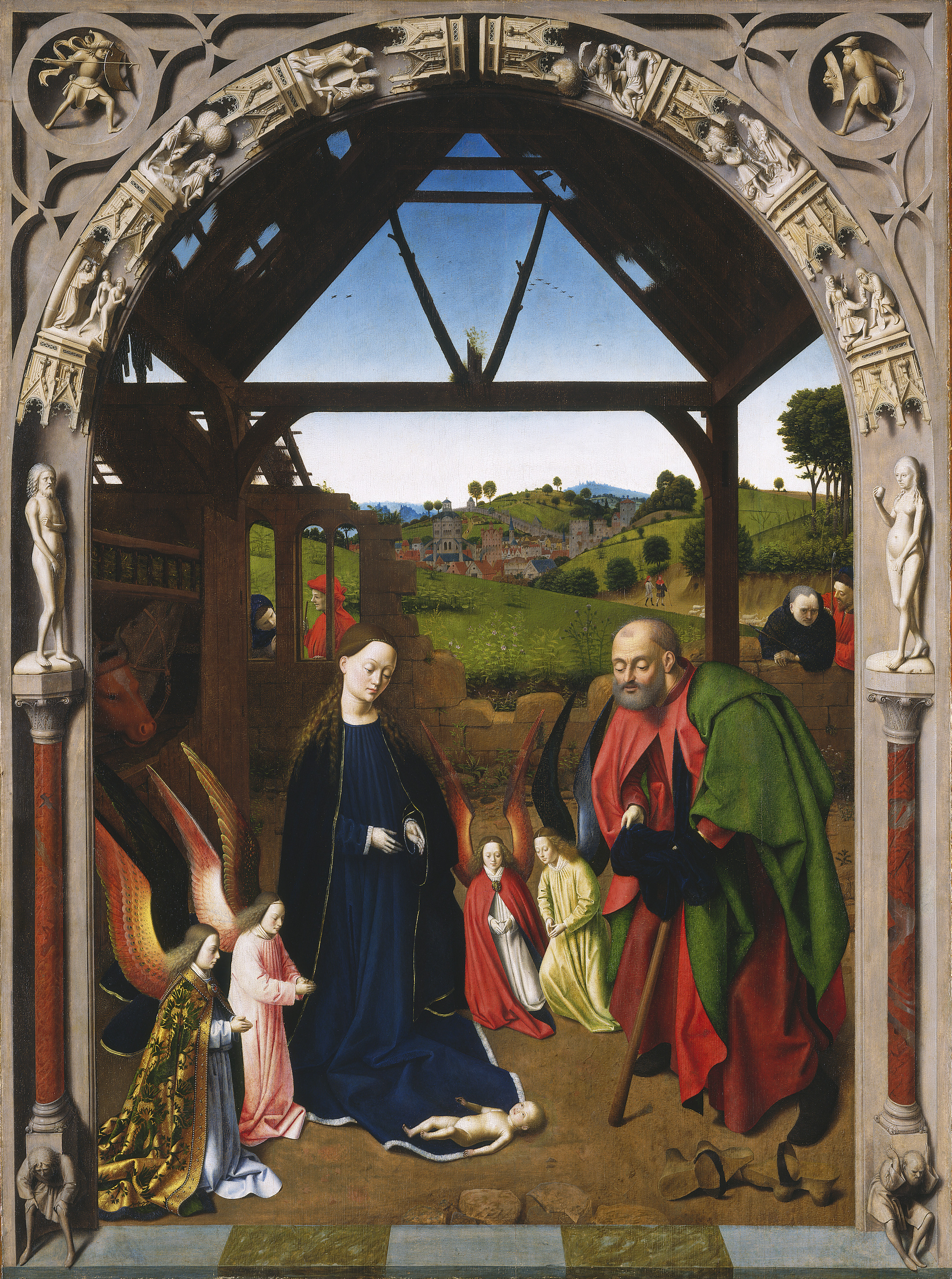
Nativity, c. mid-1450s. Oil on wood, 127.6 cm × 94.9 cm (50.2 in × 37.4 in), National Gallery of Art, Washington, D.C.

The Nativity is a devotional mid-1450s oil-on-wood panel painting by the Early Netherlandish painter Petrus Christus. It shows a nativity scene with grisaille archways and trompe-l'œil sculptured reliefs. Christus was influenced by the first generation of Netherlandish artists, especially Jan van Eyck and Rogier van der Weyden, and the panel is characteristic of the simplicity and naturalism of art of that period. Placing archways as a framing device is a typical van der Weyden device, and here likely borrowed from that artist's Saint John Altarpiece and Miraflores Altarpiece. Yet Christus adapts these painterly motifs to a uniquely mid-15th century sensibility, and the unusually large panel – perhaps painted as a central altarpiece panel for a triptych – is nuanced and visually complex. It shows his usual harmonious composition and employment of one-point-perspective, especially evident in the geometric forms of the shed's roof, and his bold use of color. It is one of Christus's most important works. Max Friedländer definitely attributed the panel to Christus in 1930, concluding that "in scope and importance, [it] is superior to all other known creations of this master."

The overall atmosphere is one of simplicity, serenity and understated sophistication. It is reflective of the 14th-century Devotio Moderna movement, and contains complex Christian symbolism, subtly juxtaposing Old and New Testament iconography. The sculpted figures in the archway depict biblical scenes of sin and punishment, signaling the advent of Christ's sacrifice, with an over-reaching message of the "Fall and Redemption of humankind". Inside the archway, surrounded by four angels, is the Holy Family; beyond, a landscape extends into the far background.

Art historians have suggested completion dates ranging from the early 1440s to the early 1460s, with c. 1455 seen as probable. The panel was acquired by Andrew Mellon in the 1930s, and was one of several hundreds from his personal collection donated to the National Gallery of Art in Washington. It has suffered damage and was restored in the early 1990s for an exhibition at the Metropolitan Museum of Art.

== Description ==
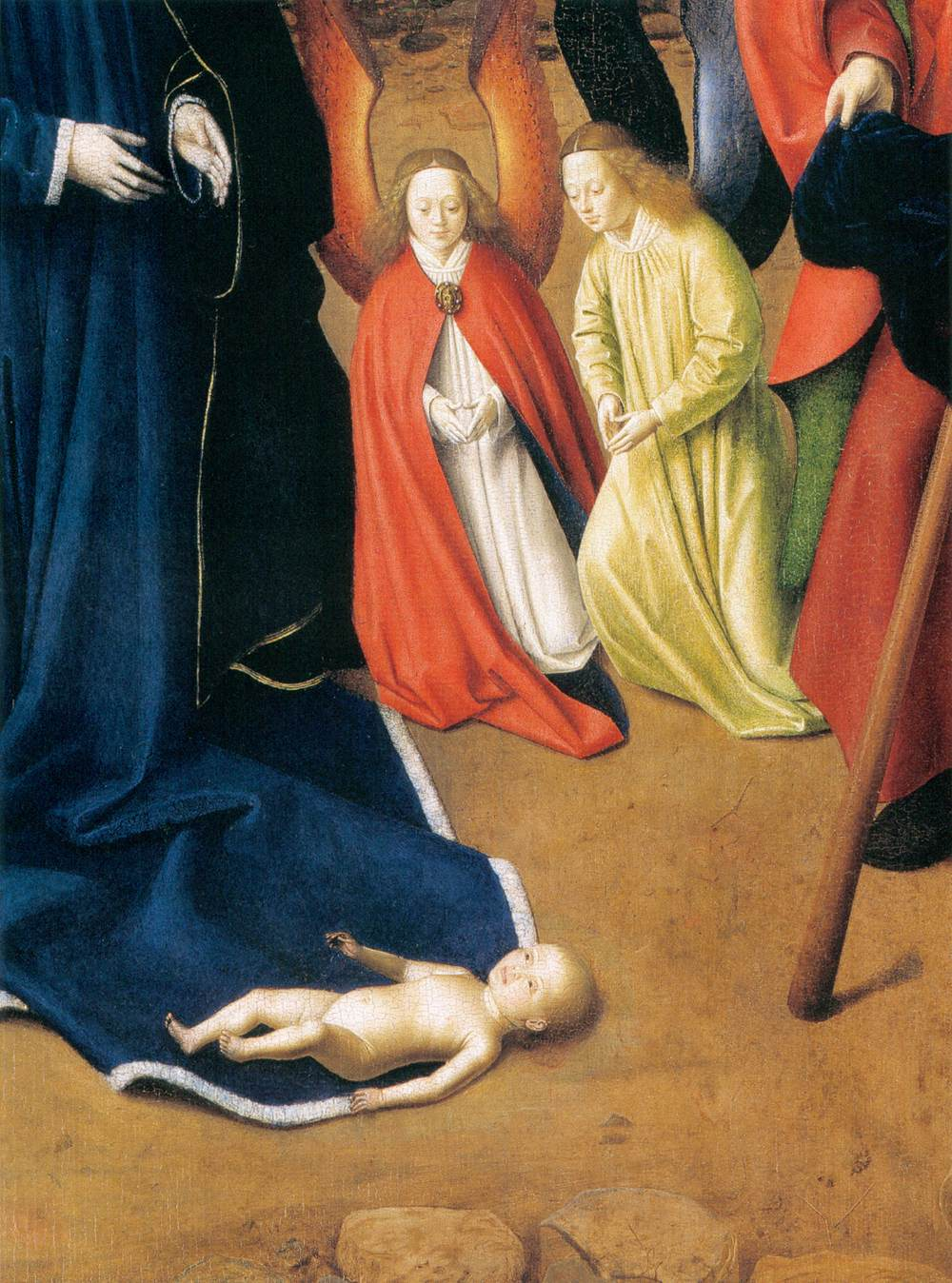
Angels in vestments adoring the Christ Child who lies on Mary's robe

The Nativity is unusually large for a 15th-century Early Netherlandish single-panel painting at 127.6 cm × 94.9 cm (50.2 in × 37.4 in), and covering four oak boards. No evidence of missing wing panels exists, yet its size suggests it may have been a central panel of a large triptych. (Note: No triptychs painted by Christus have survived, but several reconstructions have been suggested. In size the Nativity is larger than Robert Campin's Mérode Altarpiece, and several triptychs by Jan van Eyck. See Upton (1975), 53) Art historian Joel Upton writes that with its size, style, tone and composition, Christus painted "an Andachtsbild, with monumental, ciboriumlike dimensions". The distinction between the figures and the space around them is characteristic of Christus's work, as is its one-point perspective. The background landscape is serene as are the "charming, almost doll-like figures who make up the cast of characters."

The setting is a shed enclosed in the front by what appear to be two stone pillars and an archway, rendered in grisaille. A tiny figure (atlante) hunches at the base of each pillar holding it up. On each pillar stand statues of Adam and Eve – Adam on the left and Eve to the right. At the bottom a marble threshold connects the arch. The top corners of the arch have two spandrels. The Fall of Man is shown in six scenes from the Book of Genesis within the archivolt, rendered in relief. Two are of Adam and Eve; their expulsion from paradise and Adam tilling the soil. The others are of Cain and Abel: their sacrifice to God; Cain slaying Abel; God appearing to Abel; Cain expelled to the Land of Nod.

Background detail (with crackle pattern apparent) showing a 15th-century Netherlandish town with two domed structures representing Jerusalem

In the shed Mary and Joseph share an intensely private moment before the Annunciation to the shepherds of the Christ child's birth to the shepherds. They are rendered in bright colors. Mary wears a long flowing blue robe, Joseph a green-lined red cape over a brown robe. He holds his hat in hand, and his pattens are respectfully removed, left lying on the ground. They gaze reverently at the newborn figure of Jesus who lies on Mary's robe. Mary's features have a softness and sweetness more characteristic of Christus's later paintings and remarkably similar to his Madonna of the Dry Tree, according to Maryan Ainsworth. Kneeling in adoration to either side are four small angels.

Animals are visible in stalls. Behind them is a crumbling wall with three low Romanesque windows. Four shepherds in contemporary 15th-century clothing are chatting amiably, leaning against the wall, looking into the shed. Two are positioned to the left and two to the right; in each pair one is dressed in red and another in blue. Behind the shed is a small hill where two shepherds herd sheep along a pathway, and beyond is a Netherlandish town with two domed structures in its center, symbolizing Jerusalem and Christ's Passion. The large domed building is based on the Holy Sepulcher in Jerusalem, a replica of which the Adornes family built in Bruges in 1427, called the Jerusalem chapel. A flock of geese is visible high in the sky through the roof's trusses.

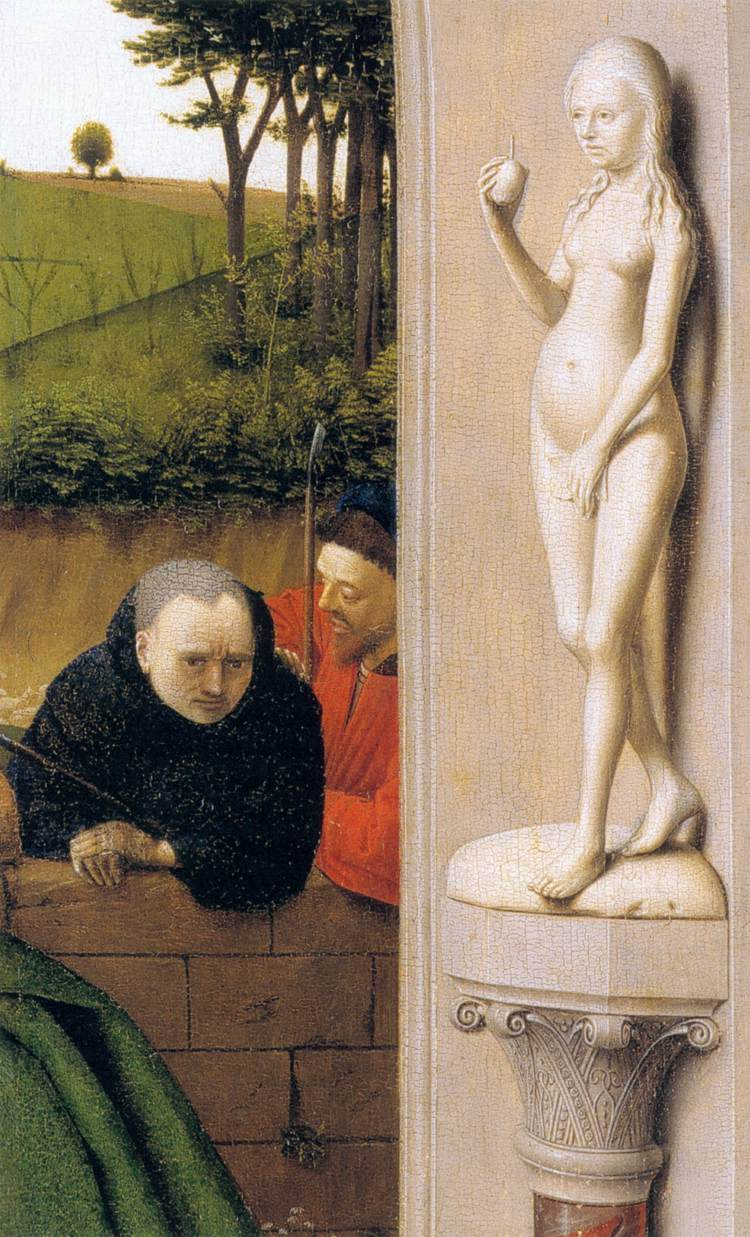
Detail of the right archway showing Eve on a pedestal, eating the forbidden fruit

Light shines into the shed from outside through the low windows. The shadows cast suggest the dawn of a new day. The four onlookers in the rear are in light and shadow, especially noticeable on the face of the man second from the right. Here Christus borrows an optical device from the work of his predecessors Jan van Eyck and Rogier van der Weyden, but is bolder and more accomplished with his use of light, which art professor Lola Gellman describes as having "no counterpoint in previous art."

== Iconography ==
The panel is rich in Christian iconography, which reflects the shift in religious attitudes to a more meditative and solitary devotion in the 14th century, exemplified by the Devotio Moderna movement. The painting is devotional; its iconography clearly juxtaposes Old and New Testament imagery, conveying themes of punishment and redemption, against the belief that a second chance is available through the birth of Christ.

Depictions of the Nativity changed significantly in European art following St Bridget's visions of the event. According to Upton, the scene "became a source of emotional reward for one's faith, a private vision in response to one's contemplation." In Bridget's version of the event, Mary does not lie in a bed while giving birth. The event occurs in a cave, where, dressed in white, Mary kneels or stands in devotion before the infant lying on the ground. Joseph holds a candle to illuminate the birth. Robert Campin's c. 1420 Nativity is representative of Bridget's narrative; the cave has been substituted by a shed with animals, Mary's handmaidens are present, while angels and shepherds rejoice. Christus simplified the narrative: removing the handmaidens and relegating the animals to the background. Mary's white dress is replaced with a deep-blue robe. His Nativity is somber and subdued, an embodiment of the "austere calm of timeless worship."

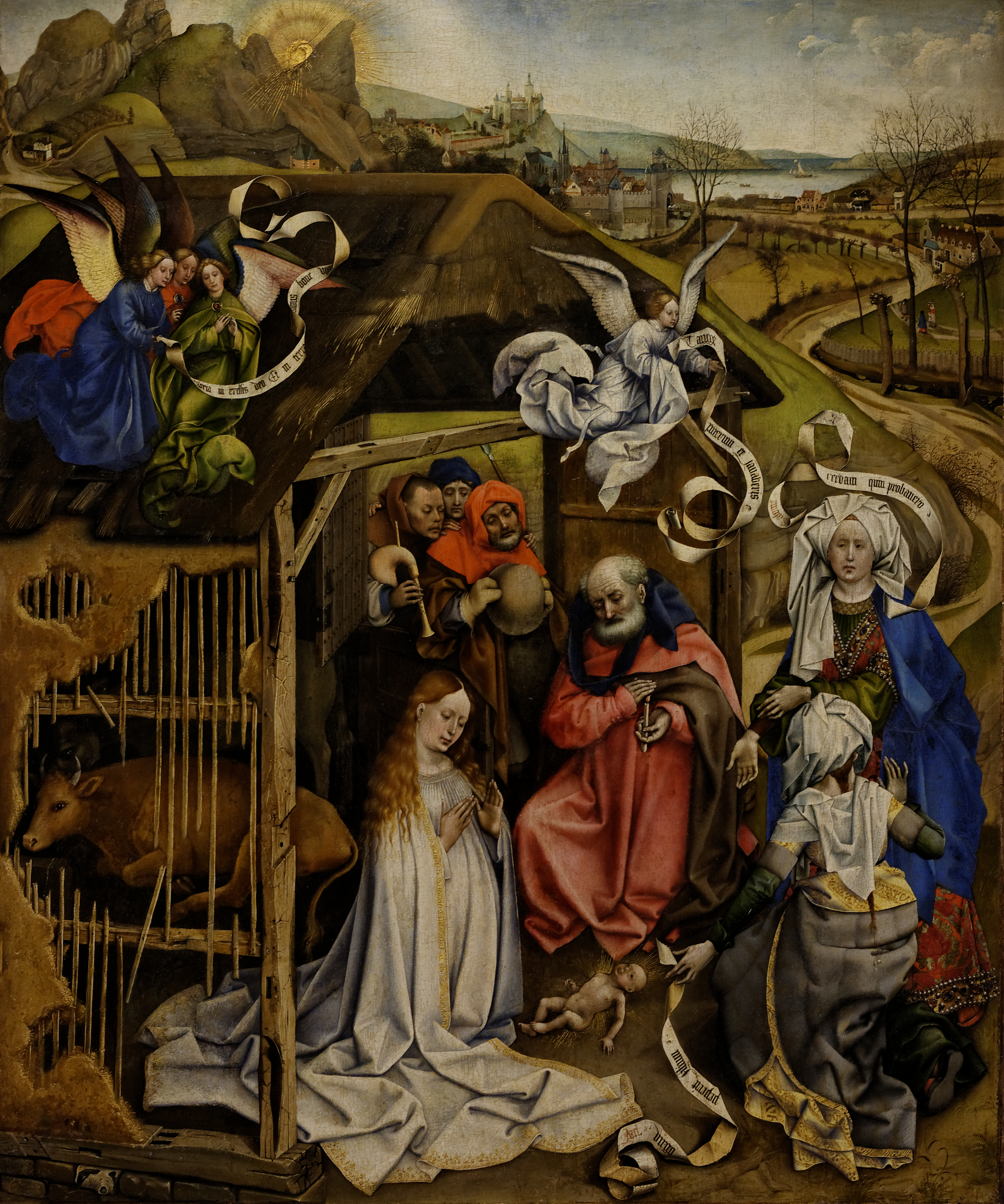
Robert Campin's c. 1420 Nativity depicts the scene in accordance with St Bridget's visions.

The Nativity conveys both the Old Testament themes of sin and punishment and the New Testament doctrine of sacrifice and redemption. Although Adam and Eve to either side of the arch are suggestive of those in van Eyck's Ghent Altarpiece, they differ significantly. Here they are painted as grisaille statues in contrast to van Eyck's lifelike versions; and, unlike van Eyck's, here Adam and Eve stand in shame hiding their nudity. Earthly sin and strife, anger and revenge, are represented in the warriors in the corner spandrels, and signify that which Christ's birth would bring to an end.

Themes of punishment and redemption are further explored in the six scenes on the arch, where the reliefs show the events from Genesis 4:1–16 (from left to right): The angel of God expelling Adam and Eve from the Garden of Eden; post-Expulsion life "when Adam delved and Eve spun"; the sacrifices of Cain and Abel; Cain killing Abel; (top) God banishing Cain; Cain saying farewell to his parents, or possibly his brother Seth leaving to find the Tree of Life, a Jewish legend from The Apocalypse of Moses, a pseudepigraphical work from antiquity.

The two uppermost reliefs on the arch, which have a central focus and function as keystones, bring attention to the juxtaposition of Old and New Testament themes. The relief to the left shows Cain and Abel sacrificing to God; on the right Cain commits the sin of murder, which God punishes. The two reliefs also function as a temporal device, leading the viewer directly to the moment of Christ's birth and mankind's redemption, which occurs below in the shed. The viewer is reminded that mankind must sacrifice to Christ, who lies directly below, or risk punishment and expulsion from the church, just as God expelled Cain. The Fall of man acted out on the archway reminds the viewer of the "necessity of Christ's sacrifice".

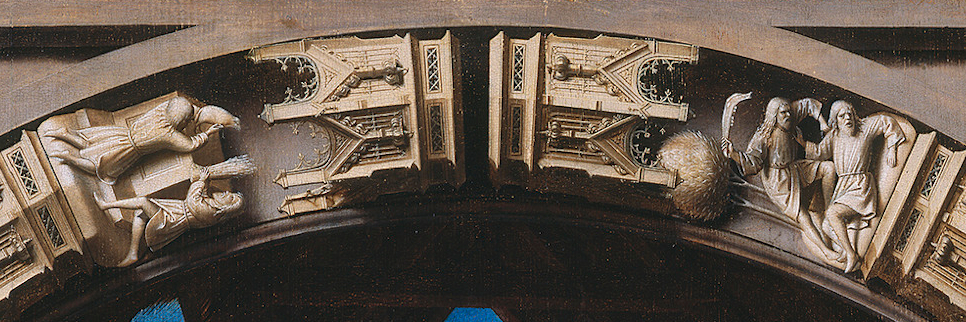
The two uppermost scenes on the archway show scenes of sacrifice and punishment.

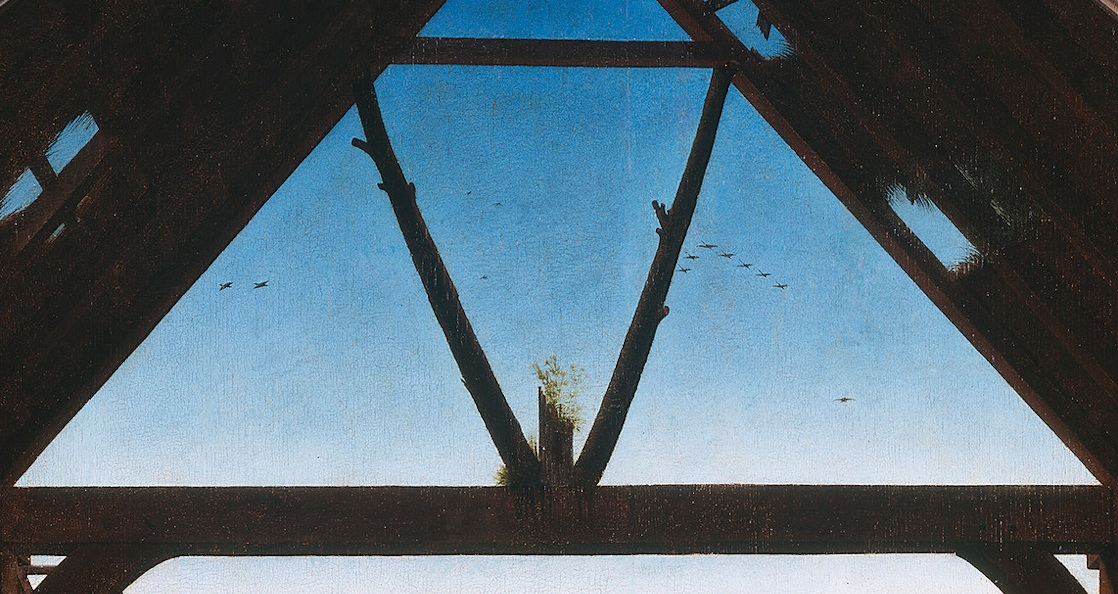
The tuft of grass in the geometrically styled roof truss conveys multiple symbolic meanings.

The semicircle of rock inside the doorsill remind the viewer to abandon sin. (Note: "If thou doest well, shalt thou not be accepted? and if thou doest not well, sin lieth at the door." (Genesis 4:7)) The viewer is reminded to reach a full understanding of the significance of the event, achieved with the two groupings of shepherds at the rear of the shed. Two of the four are active and two are passive. The man dressed in blue on the left is listening; the man in blue to the right is seeing, while their counterparts in red do neither. Although actively looking and listening, the two men in blue do not appear to have a full understanding of the event. Upton explains the medieval viewer would have understood that in the iconography Christus presented "man who would listen without hearing, and look without seeing." The viewer is reminded to comprehend the painting's vision and iconography, to fully recognize the significance of Christ's coming, to hear and see the word of God, and to obey God's wishes.

The tuft of grass sprouting from the roof's central truss above the figures conveys a number of meanings. Although the shrub is naturally rendered, Christus almost certainly placed it there for its symbolic value; its positioning suggests he followed a program of disguised iconography. The most obvious meaning is of new life and new beginnings. On a secular level, the shrub may have indicated Christus's membership in the Confraternity of the Dry Tree, which he joined sometime around 1462–63. (Note: Christus and his wife were listed as members in 1462; in 1463 they appeared on the list of new members. See Sterling (1971), 19; and Hand (1987), 41) The confraternity was prestigious, including among its ranks Burgundian nobility, such as Philip the Good and his wife Isabella, wealthy foreign merchants and members from Bruges's upper classes. The tuft of grass also symbolizes the tree of life, and Upton theorizes that by placing it there, Christus "has given expression to the legend" of Adam's third son, Seth, whose quest for a branch was a popular legend in the medieval period. Furthermore, alludes to Moses and the burning bush. According to Upton, in Christus's Nativity Joseph assumes Moses's role of protector and law-bringer; just as Joseph has removed his pattens in the presence of Christ, Moses removed his shoes in the presence of the bush.

The setting represents the Mass – the angels are clothed in Eucharistic vestments, with those on the far right dressed in a deacon's cope. None wear the celebrant's chasuble, suggesting Christ is the priest. The shed roof is a ciborium over an altar. A later addition to the painting, added perhaps in the 17th century, and since removed, was a gold paten on which the infant lay, clearly showing Jesus as the Eucharistic host. Mary, Joseph and the angels are the first to worship the infant Christ and the shed "becomes the altar of the first mass". Upton explains that when viewed in the context of the first mass the iconography is more clearly defined.

== Composition ==
Christus was the first Netherlandish painter to achieve proficiency in strict mathematical compositional rules with his use of orthogonals, creating a unified perspective. The concept of compositions "based on unitary perspective" was largely a pioneering effort on Christus's part, although he borrowed from the earlier masters. Compositionally, the Nativity is one of Christus's most complex and important works, which Ainsworth says is masterfully integrated with the use of color. X-radiography reveals sketched orthogonal lines on the underpainting, used to indicate where the horizontal and vertical axis should meet at the main figures' heads, and that he used a compass to sketch the spandrels.

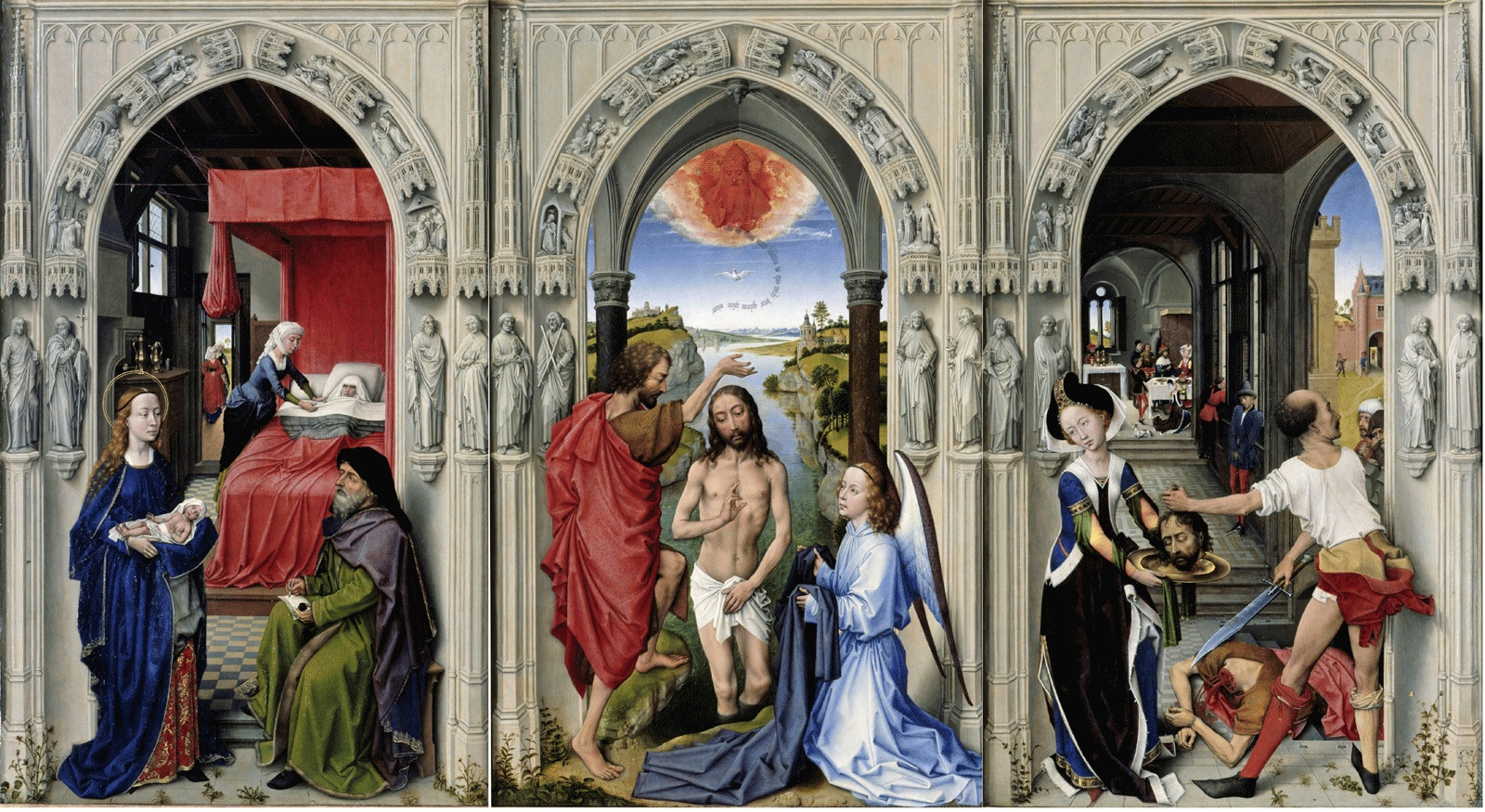
Archway reliefs in Rogier van der Weyden's Saint John Altarpiece, c. 1455. Gemäldegalerie, Berlin

The painting contains several geometric constructions. The roof of the shed's trusses form series of triangles connecting lines joining the base of the pedestals and the crossbeams. These surround the gathering of the Holy Family, who form an inverse pattern. According to art historian Lawrence Steefel, "the detail participates in an almost emblematic pattern of repeated triangles which establish a rhyme scheme above and below, of roof structure and figure disposition." Upton writes that a "clearly defined diamond" is visible within the apex in the roof. From there it extends down to Eve, and the bottom apex is formed where the infant lies on the ground. It then extends up to Adam and back up to the roof. "This diamond shape," he writes, "supplemented by the rectangle within it, formed by the shed supports, the base of the triangle and the ground line in the shed, circumscribes the main event of the painting."

Spatial and temporal borders separating the earthly and heavenly spheres are often seen in Netherlandish art, usually in the form of frames or arches. A boundary is achieved here with the grisaille archway, strongly reminiscent of van der Weyden's work. Art historians speculate Christus may have imitated his c. 1455 Saint John Altarpiece. Instead of merely imitating, Christus innovated and extended the use of van der Weyden's arch motif; his arch is meant to be an opening, or a screen, for the viewer to see into the holy space, instead of a simple framing device in which figures are placed directly in-line or under the arch. The multi-hued threshold stones at the bottom emphasize its function says Upton, who writes: "it is an opening through which one passes: a true frame or doorway to the picture ... Yet, since this arch is painted in grisaille, distinct from the rest of the panel, it must also be seen as a separate entity, much like an elaborate border around an illuminated manuscript page." The shadows cast by the grisaille figures stress "its function as a diaphragm between real and illusory space".

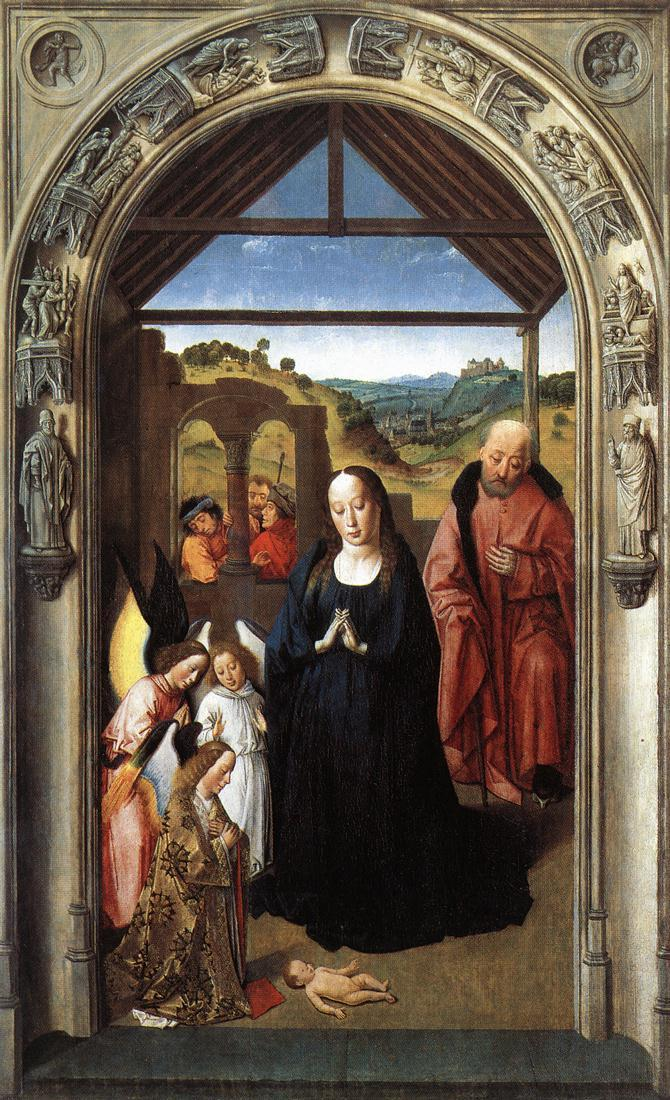
Central panel of Dieric Bouts c. 1445 Mary Altarpiece. This piece is similar in style to Christus's Nativity

A very similar archway is found in Dieric Bouts's c. 1445 Mary Altarpiece, including spandrels with warriors. Art historians are unsure which was painted earlier – Christus's Nativity or Bouts's altarpiece. Equally, van der Weyden's arched triptychs were executed at roughly the same period, but art historians are more certain Rogier's archivolt design set the precedent. Unlike Bouts and van der Weyden, Christus appears to have used the device to encompass a single scene, incorporating all the main characters within the arch, instead of a linked series of scenes with separate archways.

The arch is only a prelude to the complex divisions beyond. The space inhabited by the Holy Family is holy ground. Mary, Joseph, the Christ child and the four surrounding angels occupy a space partitioned in the front by the archway and by the wall at the rear. A semicircle of figures is positioned around Christ, echoed in the semicircle of rocks placed directly inside the doorsill. Mary and Joseph are echoed by the colorful vertical porphyry columns on the sides, and by the statues of Adam and Eve. The rear of the shed where the four men stand, the small valley with the shepherds, the town, and the background landscape are also spatially discrete areas, which create a "steady, measured movement into space in place of the more abrupt jumping from foreground to distant background common to Flemish painting." They also function to surround the Holy Family while simultaneously preventing its isolation from the world. Ainsworth writes that the "message of the painting quietly emerges from the strict, perspectively correct space constructed to engage the viewer." Upton agrees, explaining that the use of geometric devices emphasize the focal point, which "falls well below the horizon in the exact center of the panel", a perspective that would have given the 15th center viewer, kneeling in front of the panel, a "sense of physical relationship between the actual and ideal act of worship."

== Dating and condition ==
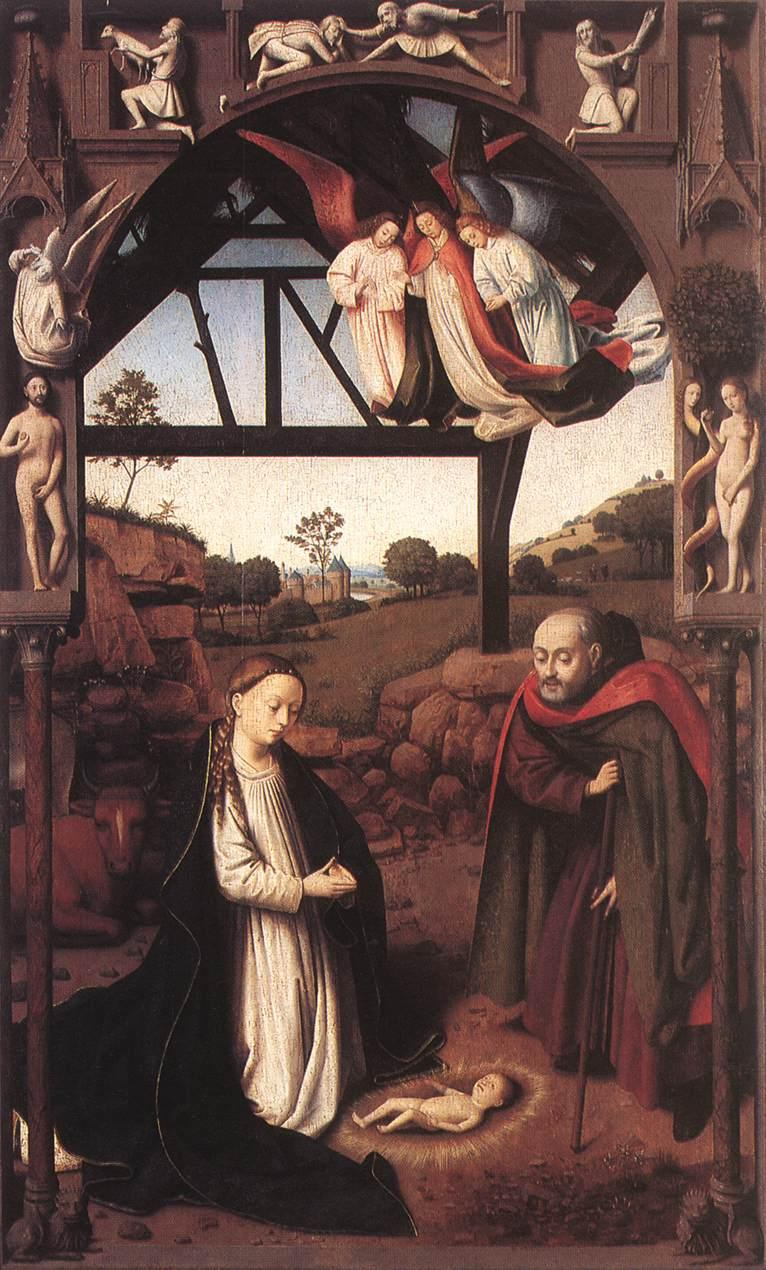
Christus's earlier version of the Nativity, now at the Groeningemuseum in Bruges, is signed and dated 1452.

The Nativity's dating has long been a source of debate among scholars. Estimations range from the mid-1440s to the mid-1450s; early in Christus's career to about the time van der Weyden painted his c. 1455 Saint John Altarpiece. Generally the mid-1450s seems the most accepted. Ainsworth considers it, along with Christus's Holy Family (currently in Kansas City), one of the most important attributed to him and believes it belongs in his later oeuvre, possibly as late as the mid-1460s. Evidence such as when Christus joined the Confraternity of the Dry Tree (c. early 1460s) points to it as a later work along with the Portrait of a Young Girl. Its use of perspective and assimilation of van Eyck's and van der Weyden's earlier influences also suggest a later date. Furthermore, the softer facial types utilized in the Nativity are typical of Christus's later work, and suggest a date around the mid-1450s. Technical analysis (dendrochronological evidence) suggests a date of c. 1458, based on the tree felling date. Christus painted two other versions of the Nativity: one in Bruges and the other in Berlin. The Bruges Nativity is dated 1452 – whether the date was added by Christus or during a restoration is unknown – and technical analysis of the brushstrokes suggests it to be earlier than the Washington Nativity.

Determining the execution date relies on stylistic analysis, and the degree of van der Weyden's influence. The dating of the work to the 1440s is based on the notion that Christus borrowed heavily from the immediate influence of van der Weyden and Bouts. Although some of the similarities are undeniably striking and might be attributed to following a template, the degree of sophistication in the Nativity far surpasses the other two painters, according to Ainsworth. She writes that Bouts and van der Weyden "merely expand the narrative" in their use of the archway motif, whereas Christus shows a strong cause and effect between sin and redemption, innovations which almost certainly evolved later in his career, placing the date no earlier than the mid-1450s.

Detail of the painting before it was cleaned and restored in the early 1990s, when the gold paten on Mary's gown and the faint halo around her head were removed.

The underdrawing is visible through modern technical analysis, revealing the main group of figures and contour lines in the folds and drape of the clothing. The angels' wings to Mary's left are visible, but not those to the right, probably because of later overpainting. In the underdrawing Mary's gown extends far to the left of the angel, but Christus apparently changed his mind about its execution.

The work has suffered damage: cracking where three wood panels are joined, paint loss to parts of the crackle pattern, and discoloration of varnishes. The largest area of paint loss occurred on Joseph's shoulder. Mary's robe has been completely restored and overpainted. Some paint loss is barely discernible in the areas around her hair. In many areas the paint layers and underlying support are in good condition.

The Nativity was one of 13 works hung at the Metropolitan Museum of Art's 1994 exhibition, "Petrus Christus: Renaissance Master of Bruges". It underwent significant restoration in preparation. Technicians removed over-paint probably dating to its Spanish provenance. The addition included the gold paten on Mary's robe, pigment under the Christ child, and the halos above Mary and Jesus. As early as 1916, Friedländer questioned the presence of halos in Christus's work, rarely seen in mid-15th century Netherlandish painting. When the halos were carefully examined they were found to be later additions; before the exhibition they were removed from several paintings, including the Portrait of a Carthusian.

== Provenance ==
The painting is today in the National Gallery of Art in Washington, D.C., which was conceived by Pittsburgh financier Andrew Mellon in the late 1930s. It was one of 126 paintings from his personal collection donated to the gallery and was on display at the museum opening in March 1941 – three years after his death.

It belonged to Señora O. Yturbe of Madrid, who sold it in 1930 to Franz M. Zatzenstein, founder of the Matthiesen Gallery in Berlin. That April, the Duveen Brothers, less affected by the 1929 stock market crash than other dealers, paid Zatzenstein £30,000, in cash, for the painting and sold it immediately to Mellon. A dealer usually had to go through the lengthy process of sending photographs of a painting via trans-Atlantic ship to an American buyer and then wait for a reply; the transaction for the Nativity is exceptional because it is the first painting of which the photograph was wired via Marconi cable from England to America. To avoid the export fees due if the painting been sent directly to New York, the Duveens took a circuitous route – from Madrid to Germany, then to Paris and America. In 1936 it was acquired by the A.W. Mellon Educational and Charitable Trust, and gifted to the National Gallery a year later.

Given its size and orientation, the panel was probably meant to stand alone, but may have been conceived as the wing of triptych altarpiece. Who commissioned the piece or how it came to be in the possession of a Spanish owner is unknown. At least half of Christus's known patrons were Italian or Spanish, and he often changed his style to suit their desire. Around eight of his paintings – only about 25 are extant – have come from either Italy or Spain, giving credence to speculation that he spent time there. Yet the existence of the thriving export market in early Netherlandish panel painting suggests equally that it could have been painted in Bruges and transported south.
