= Triptych with Scenes from the Life of the Virgin =

Triptych by Dieric Bouts

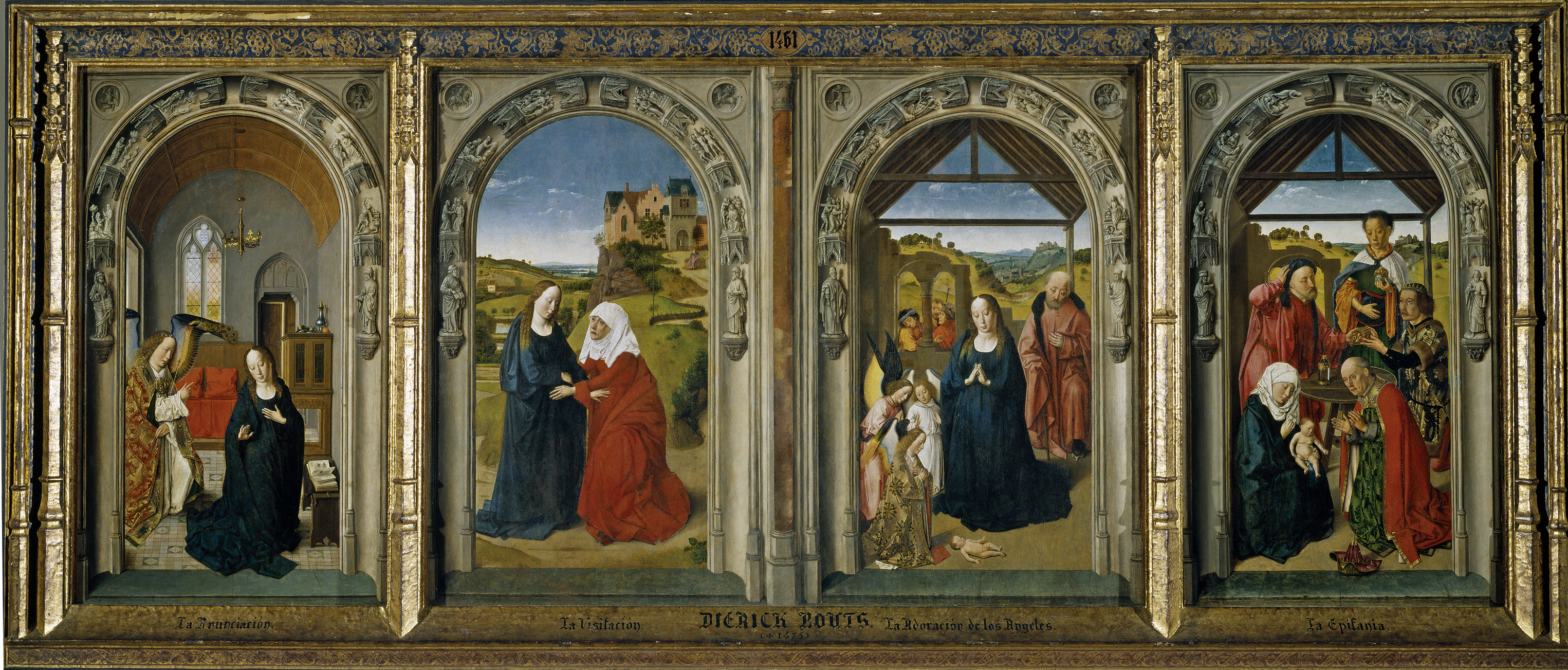
Dirk Bouts, Triptych with Scenes from the Life of the Virgin, c. 1445, oil on panel, 80 × 217 cm (31 × 85 in), Museo del Prado, Madrid.

The Triptych with Scenes from the Life of the Virgin is an oil painting on panel by the Early Netherlandish painter Dieric Bouts. It was executed c. 1445 and is now in the Museo del Prado, in Madrid.

== Description ==
The triptych was in the Spanish royal collection by the reign of Philip II of Spain, and was documented in 1584 at El Escorial, in Madrid, from 1584-1839 until it was moved to the Royal Museum (today's Prado). It consists of three panels, today mounted together in a fixed frame, but the two outside panels formally functioned as hinged wings that could be closed. There is no record of the shutter doors in the closed state and the back side of the outer doors show no signs of former drawings under grey overpaint.

The triptych comprises four scenes from the life of the Virgin Mary: the Annunciation, the Visitation, the Adoration of the Angels, and the Adoration of the Magi. The painted "sculptures" around the arches of the portals derive from Rogier van der Weyden's Miraflores Altarpiece, from some three years earlier. As there, these subsidiary sculptures have ornamented Gothic settings, while the main portal arches are round. This latter feature probably represents awareness of early Italian Renaissance architecture.

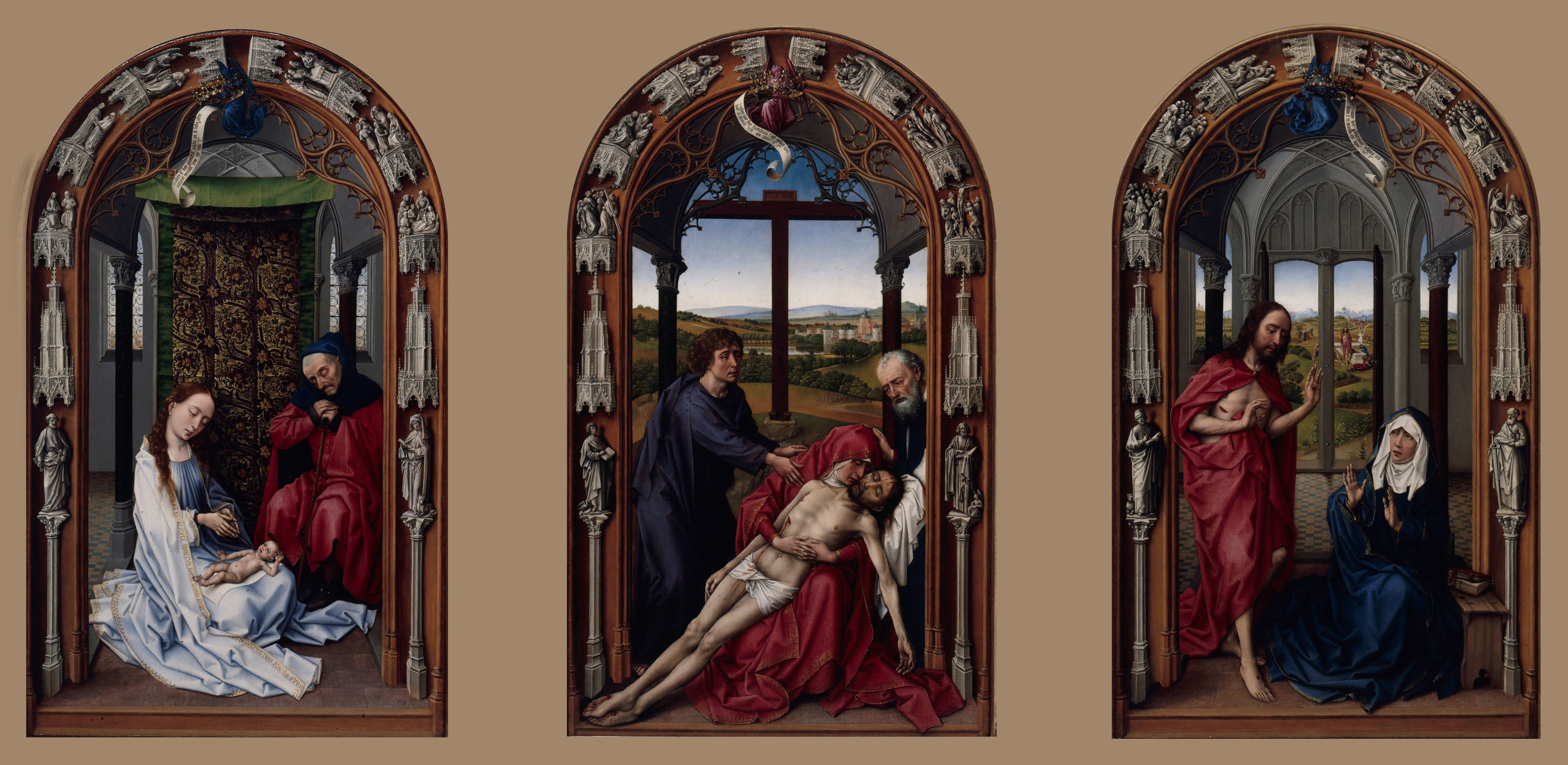
Rogier van der Weyden, Miraflores Altarpiece, oil on panel, 38.7 × 30.3 cm, Gemäldegalerie, Berlin

The annunciation scene shows similarities with the Getty version, once part of a triptych itself. The red cushions on the bed and the tiled floor are further worked out, and the Virgin is kneeling instead of seated.

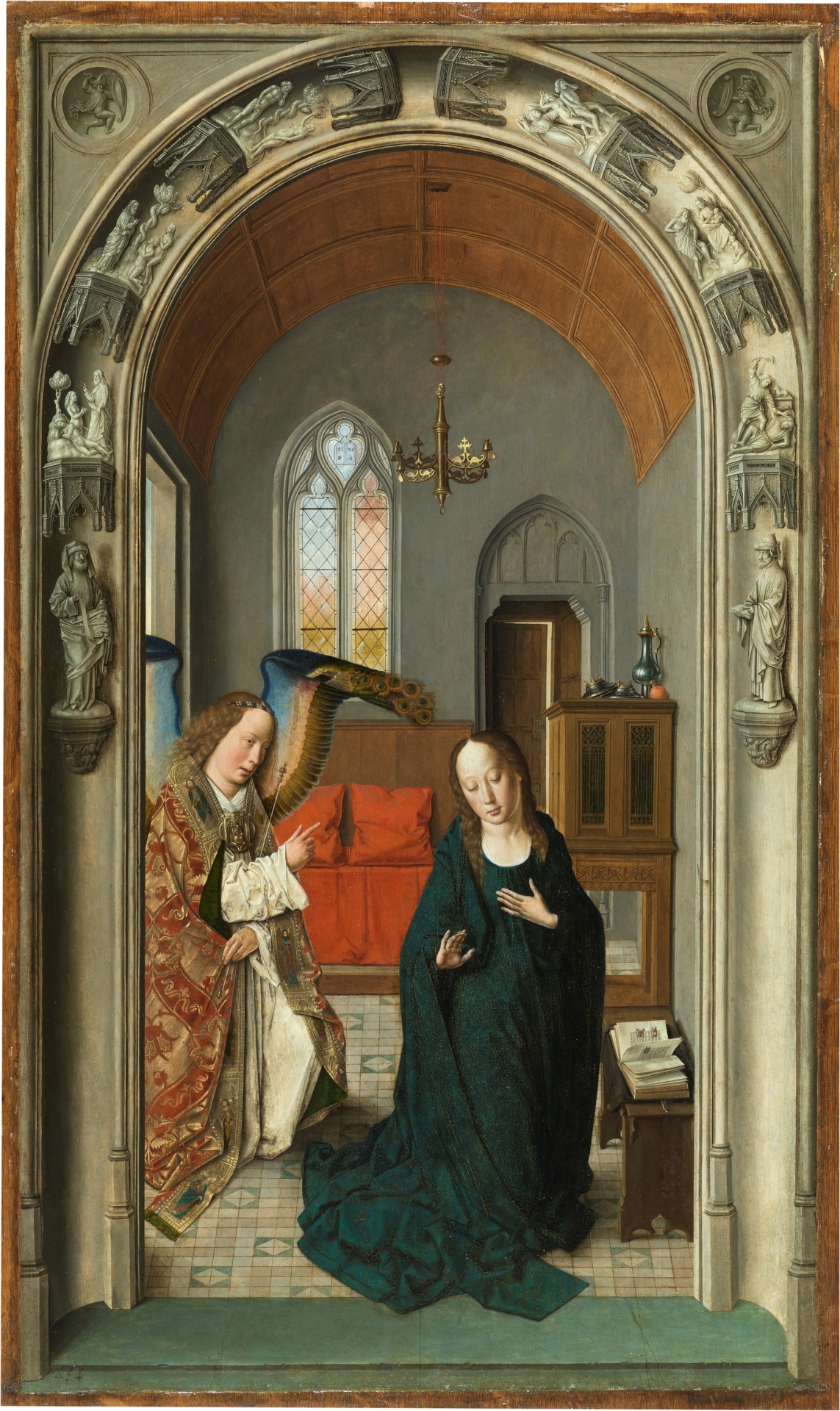
Annunciation scene

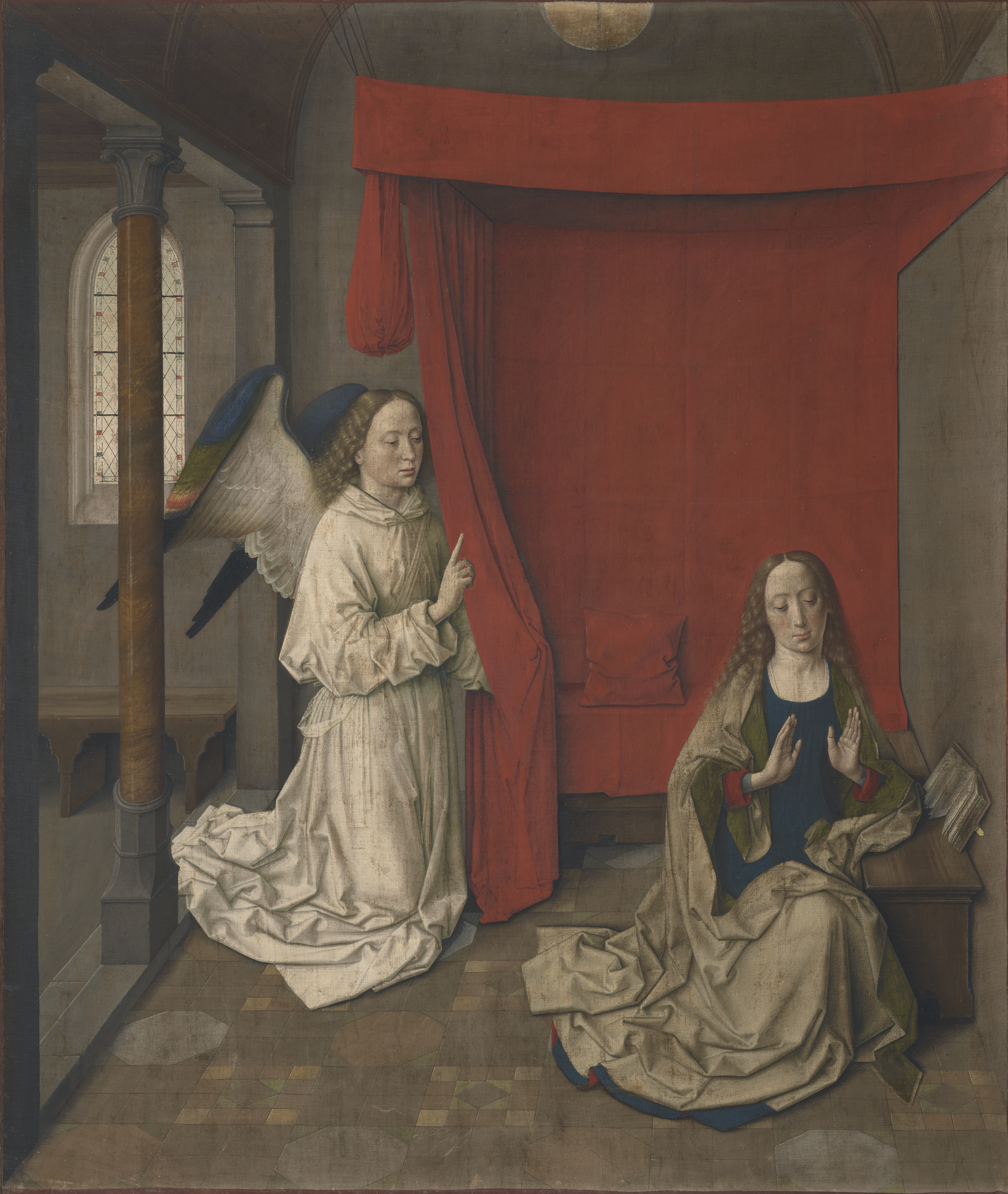
Annunciation, J. Paul Getty Museum

The visitation scene shows similarities with the version by Rogier van der Weyden in Leipzig, with both women meeting in a landscape and touching each other's pregnant wombs.

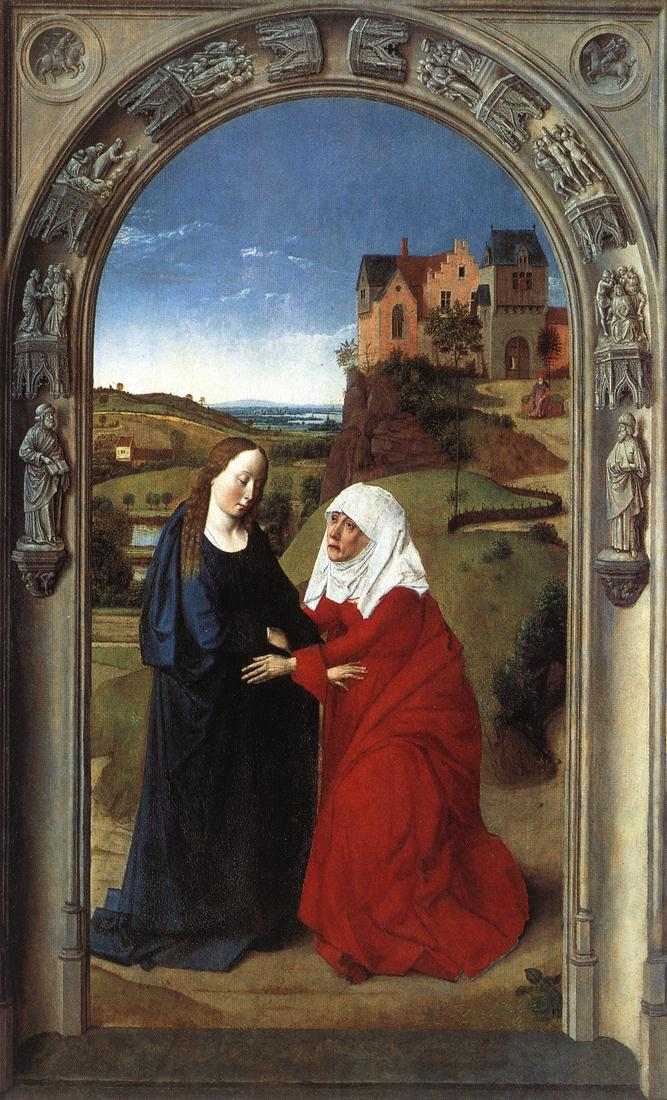
Visitation scene

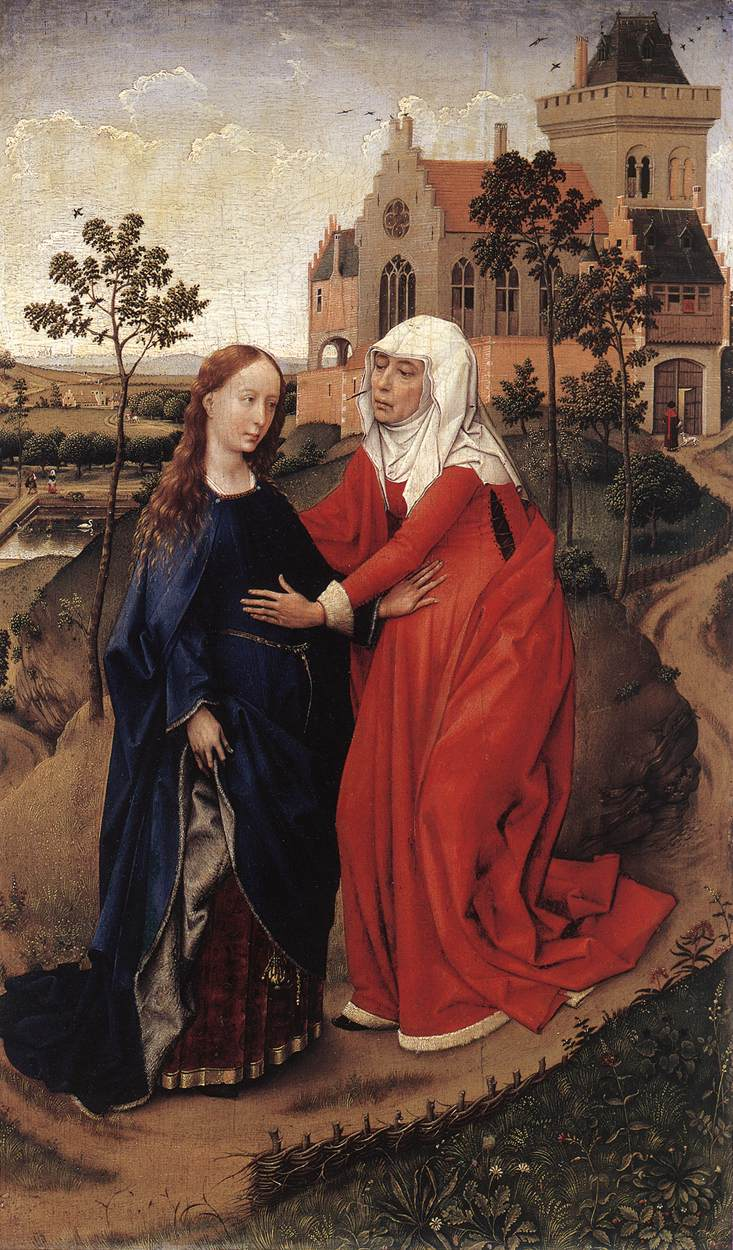
Rogier van der Weyden, Visitation, Museum der bildenden Künste

The nativity scene has strong affinities with Petrus Christus's Washington Nativity, and the painting was once attributed to Christus. The attribution of the work to Bouts with Rogier van der Weyden influence only began to gain ground among specialist authors in the 1920s. Erwin Panofsky believed that the strong connection is evidence that the young Dieric Bouts attached himself to Petrus Christus early in his career. The figure of Joseph resembles that of Bouts' nativity fragment in Philadelphia. Both show the Child Jesus on the cold ground, rather than on Mary's cloak or swaddling clothes.

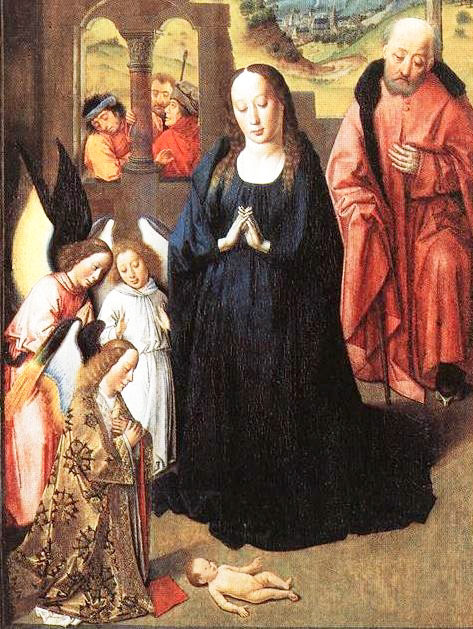
Nativity scene detail

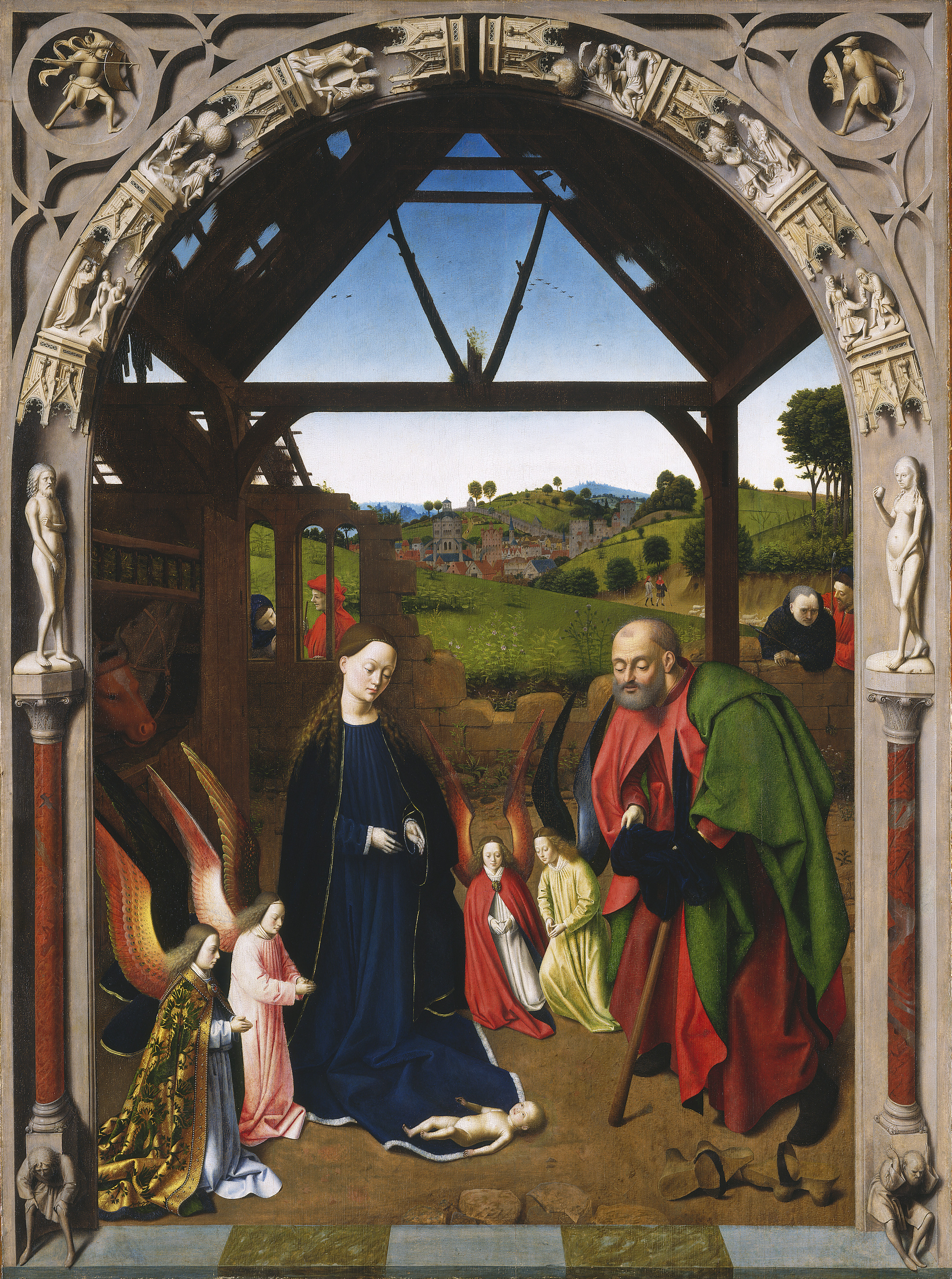
Petrus Christus, Nativity, oil on panel, 127.6 x 94.9cm, National Gallery of Art, Washington, D.C.

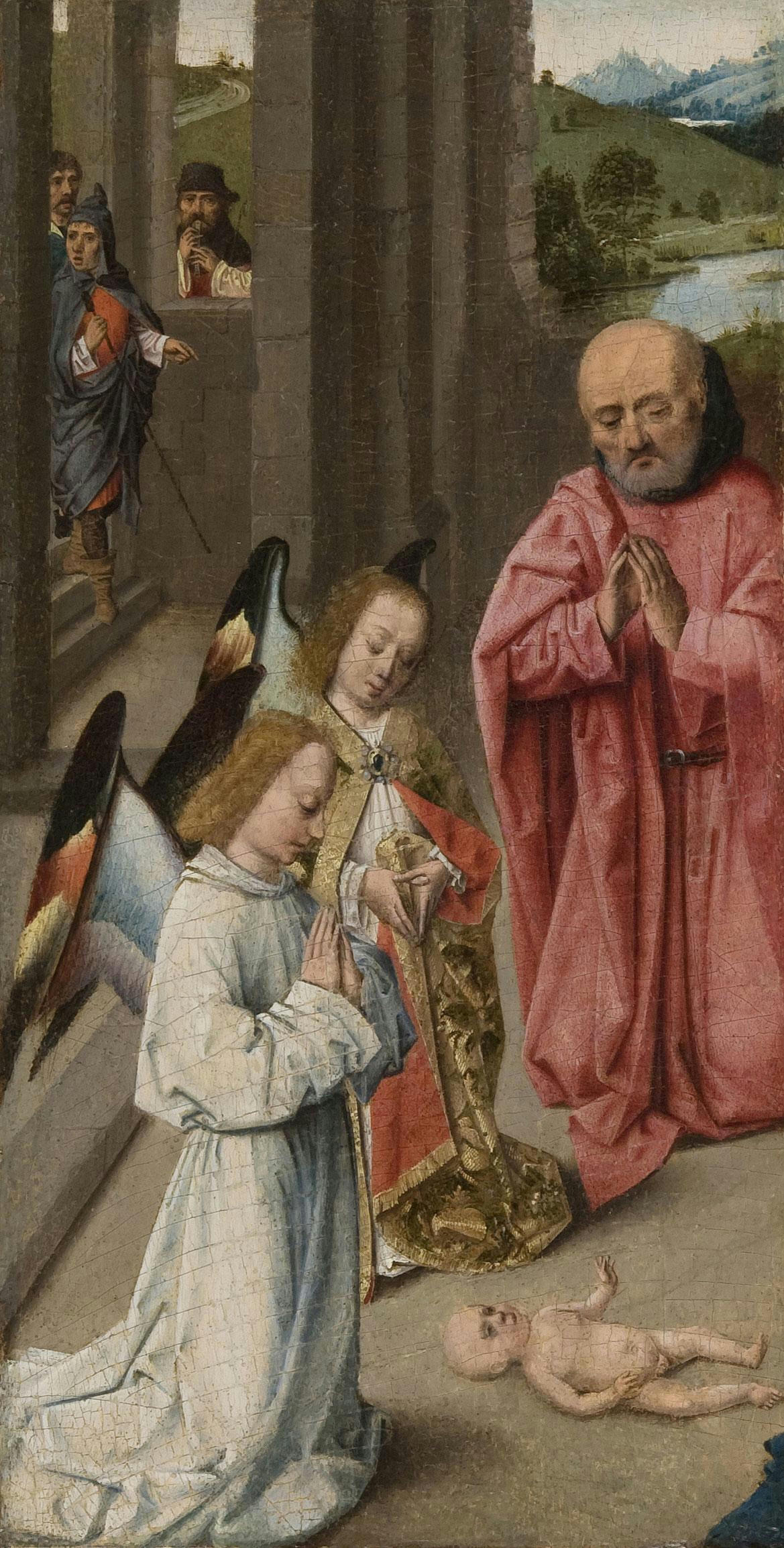
Nativity fragment, Philadelphia Museum of Art

Th adoration of the magi shows similar characteristics as the version in Munich, with Joseph receiving the gifts brought by the magi.

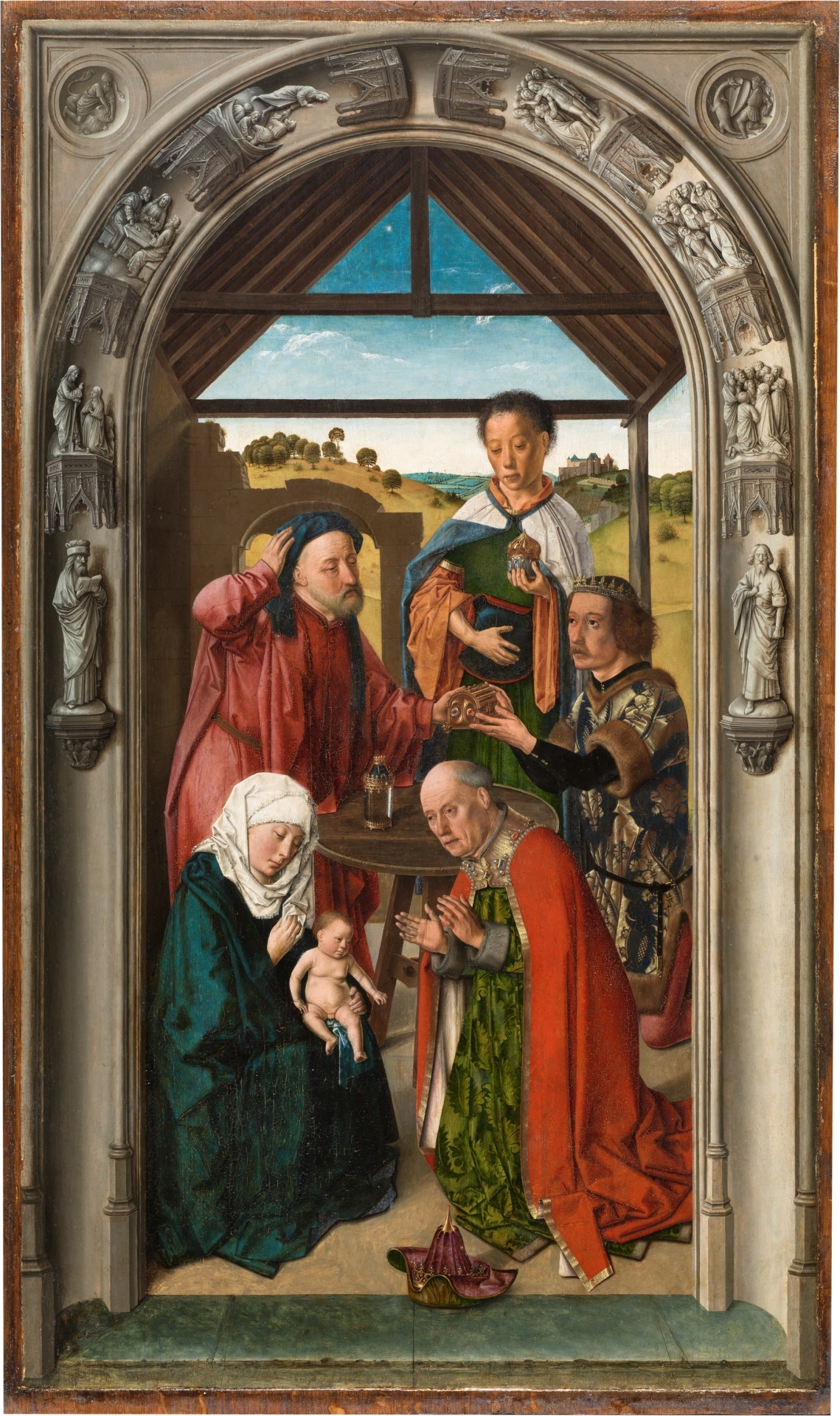
Adoration of the magi scene

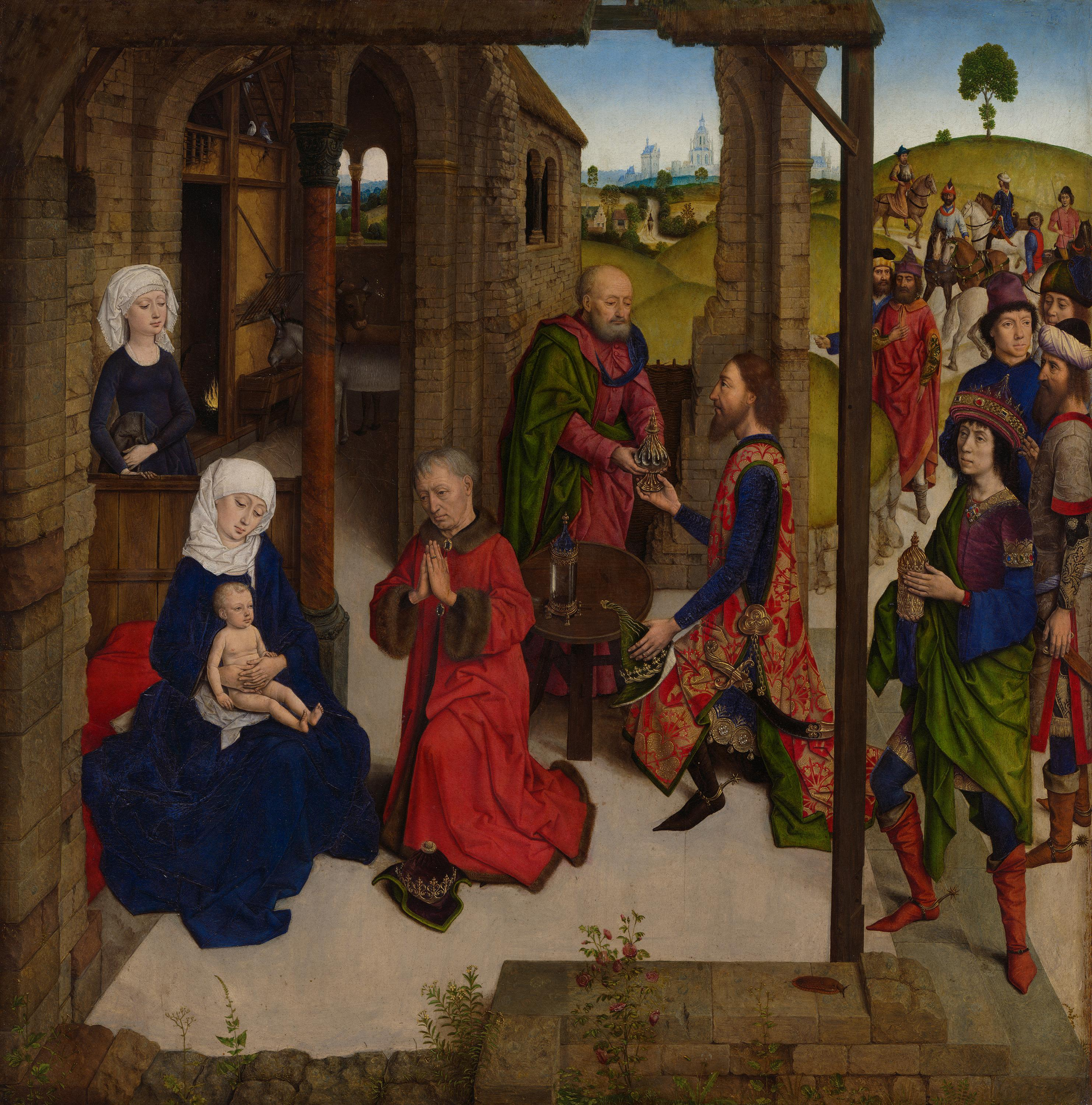
Adoration of the Magi, Alte Pinakothek

== Bibliography ==
- Panofsky, Erwin. Early Netherlandish Painting. London: Harper Collins, 1971. ISBN 0-06-430002-1
