= Saint John Altarpiece (van der Weyden) =

Triptych by Rogier van der Weyden

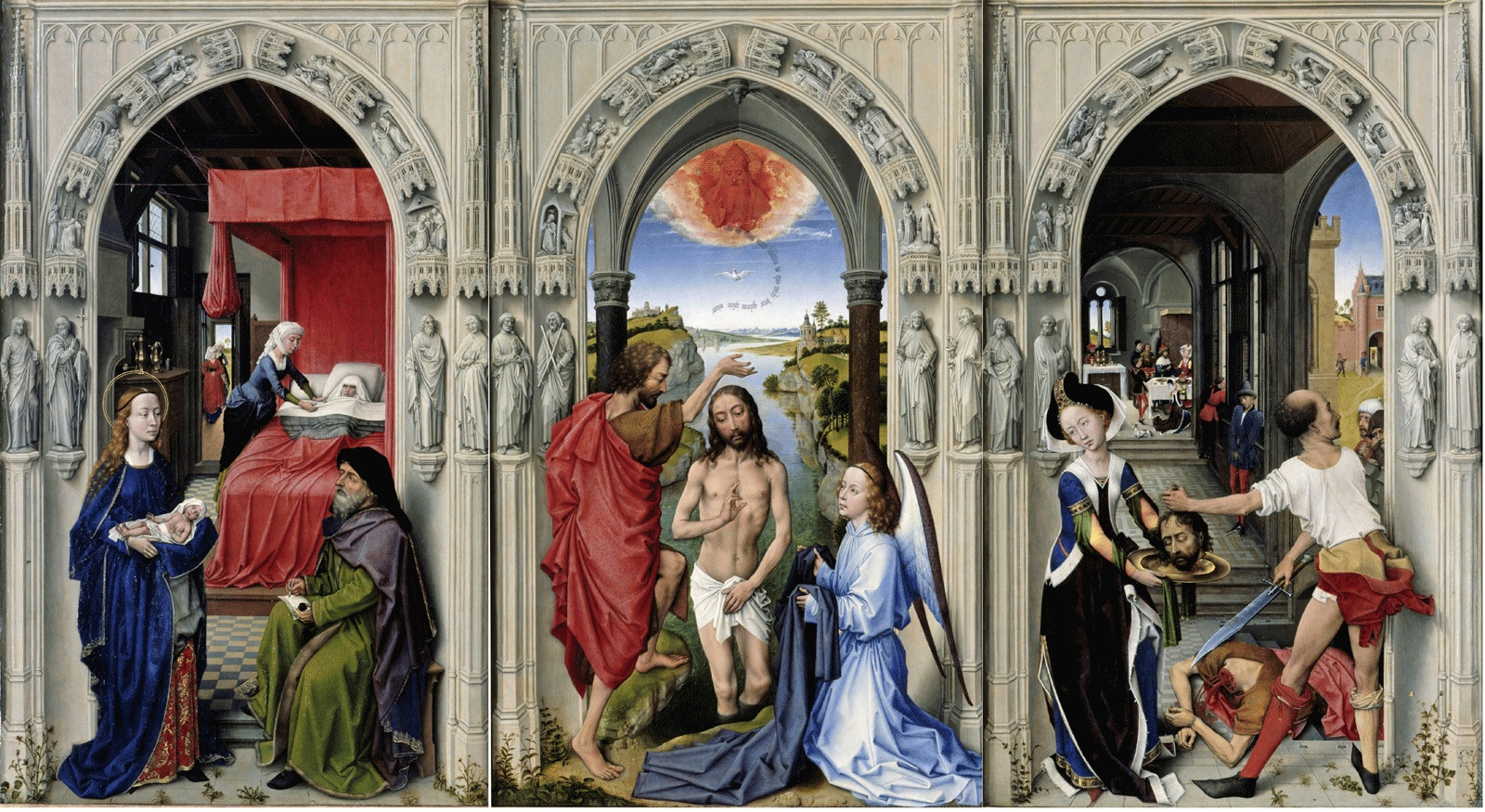
Rogier van der Weyden's Saint John Altarpiece. Oil on oak panel, each frame 77 x 48cm. Gemäldegalerie, Berlin

The Saint John Altarpiece (German: Johannesaltar, Johannestafel or Johannesretabel) is triptych of c. 1455 in oils on oak panel by the Early Netherlandish painter Rogier van der Weyden, now in the Gemäldegalerie, Berlin. The triptych is linked to the artist's earlier Miraflores Altarpiece in its symbolic motifs, format and intention. The painting was featured in the 1980 BBC Two series 100 Great Paintings.

The panels show – from left to right – the birth of Saint John the Baptist, his baptism of Christ in the River Jordan, and his beheading, with Salome receiving the disembodied head on a plate. Each panel is set within painted archivolts, which contain painted reliefs depicting statuettes of the Apostles, and scenes from the lives of both Christ and Saint John, with the overall theme of salvation. The fictive sculptural reliefs are painted in grisaille, and give the impression that the scenes are set within a church.

There are two, almost equally sized versions, leading to difficulty in establishing attribution and authenticity. The Berlin triptych is considered the original and the Frankfurt version a near-contemporary copy.

== Description ==
The three panels describe the major events in Saint John's life: his birth, his baptism of Christ, and his decapitation at the hands of Salome. The reliefs in the archivolts detail secondary events from his life. The overall theme is of the sacraments; each panel can be associated with a specific liturgical ceremony. Of the six archivolt scenes, four show scenes of the Life of the Virgin, including her marriage to Joseph, the Annunciation and the Nativity of Christ.

=== Birth of John ===
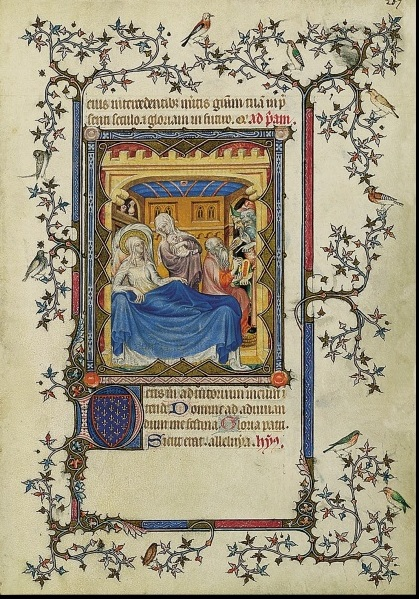
Birth and Naming of Saint John the Baptist, before 1388, Petites Heures de Jean de Berry, Folio 207r

The archivolts of this panel show the angel appearing to John's father Zacharias, in the temple. According to Luke 1:12–17, an angel of the Lord had earlier appeared and announced to Zechariah that his wife would give birth to a son, whom he was to name John, and that this son would be the forerunner of the Lord. Citing their advanced age, Zechariah asked with disbelief for a sign so he would know the truth of this prophecy. In reply, the angel identified himself as Gabriel, sent by God, and stated that because of Zechariah's doubt he would be struck dumb and "not able to speak, until the day that these things shall be performed". This punishment of muteness is referred to in the archivolt reliefs.

Zacharias appears in the main panel sitting in the foreground with a pen and scroll. To his right, Mary presents his son to him. By including the Virgin, Rogier strays from the Gospel account of the scene, referring instead to the apocryphal version popularised by the Golden Legend and the Meditations on the Life of Christ, both of which have Mary presenting the infant John the Baptist. Erwin Panofsky suggests that Rogier might have been influenced by Andrea Pisano's relief The Naming of the Baptist at the Florence Baptistery, which shows a similar scene of Mary presenting to Zechariah, who sits holding a pen and scroll.

=== Baptism of Christ ===
In the central panel John can be identified by his red robe. This panel shows the apparition of God in the sky above painted in red hues, from which emanates a curved Latin script, above a dove. The panels are typical of the harmony and unity characteristic of Rogier; especially in the manner in which the figures echo each other. This is most evident in the figure of the woman in the birth panel, who occupies the same space and resembles Salome to the far right.

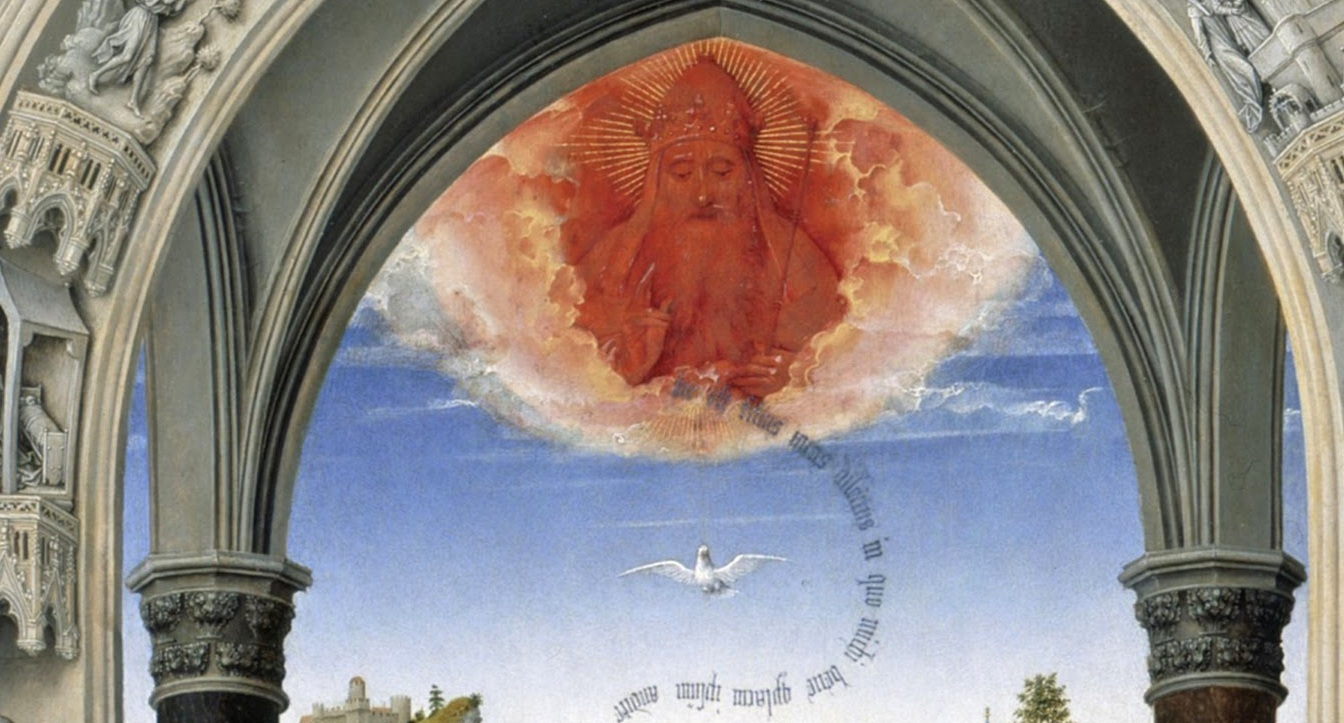
Detail of the central panel showing the head of God

Christ stands fully in front of the viewer, positioned in a stream with water rising to just below his knees. To his right, John blesses him with his hand raised over Christ's head. God the Father is shown ascending from the clouds. He sends down a dove to bless the occasion. The dove is accompanied by, in the art historian Barbara Lane's words, a "gracefully curving inscription" taken from Matthew 17:5, which reads "This is my beloved Son in whom I am well pleased; hear ye him." Traditionally, the baptism is where Jesus is first presented as the son of God, his divinity first revealed to the world, here symbolised by the ascendance of the dove and God's words.

=== Death of John ===
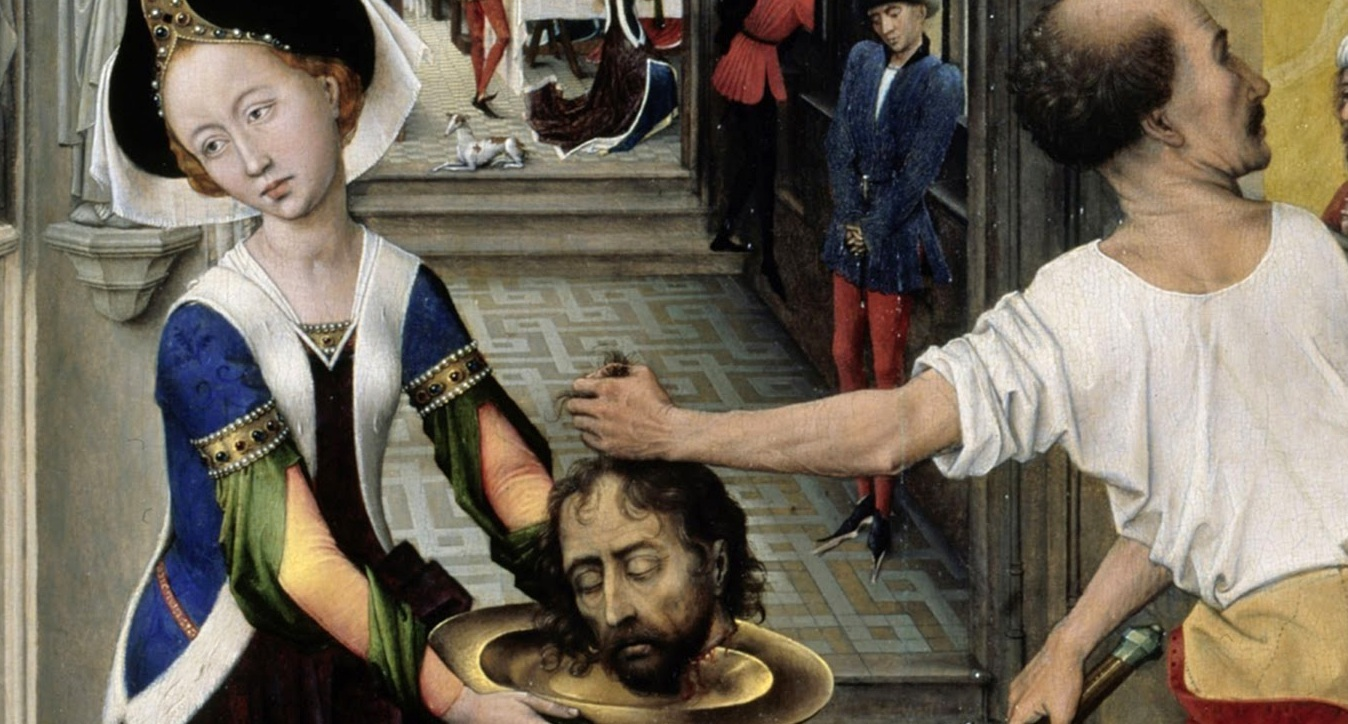
Detail of Salome receiving the saint's severed head on a platter

The right hand panel is unusually dramatic and also deviates from the Gospel account. Instead of a prison setting, the scene is shown in a domestic interior. In most depictions, Salome holds an empty charger; here the head has been placed on the charger. John's limp body lies at the foot of the stairs, blood pumping from the neck, as the executioner, still holding his sword, hands the head to Salome on a golden charger. Salome, according to Lane, "demurely averts her glance", as does the executioner, who turns right to look out of a large window. In the background, she is shown presenting the head to her mother, the Judaean princess Herodias, at what appears to be the Feast of Herod.

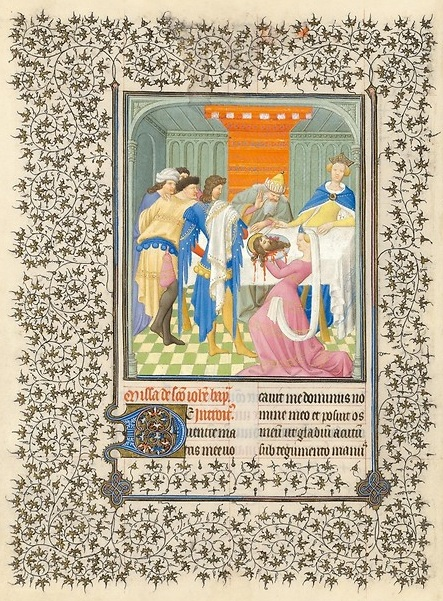
Limbourg brothers, Salome Presents the Head of John the Baptist at the Banquet of Herod, 1405–1408-09. Belles Heures of Jean de France, Duc de Berry, fol. 212v

Salome is painted to the late Gothic ideal, with narrow shoulders, a thin frame, and a generic idealised face. She wears a headdress and a blue gown with white lining and green undersleeves.

In the panel, Rogier refers to the Communion, in that John's head "signifies the body of Christ which feeds us on the holy altar". Lane writes that "Salome's charger ... apparently corresponds to the golden paten on which the Host is placed during the sacrifice of the Mass". The art historian Victoria Reed agrees with this analysis, noting that John's head has become a eucharistic symbol, and that "by receiving it, Salome takes the part of the Christian communicant". She observes that the charger resembles a paten, while the sleeves of Salome's dress are "reminiscent of a liturgical cloth with which to bear the sacrament".

== Provenance ==
The work was commissioned by Battista Agnelli, a merchant from Pisa, for Saint James's Church, Bruges. It is smaller than van der Weyden's other altarpieces, and probably intended as a side altarpiece or private devotional object. The frames are mounted together and cannot fold inwards. Therefore, it is not a triptych, but a purpose-designed altarpiece. It is thought to have been commissioned by a Spanish donor; there is compelling evidence that it is the same work described in the Carthusian monastery of Santa Maria de las Cuevas in Seville. José Martín Rincón in 1744 wrote of a "portable oratory" showing the Baptism of Christ, flanked by scenes of John's birth and beheading, though he attributed this work to Albrecht Dürer. In 1778 the Spanish historian Antonio Ponz mentioned the same altarpiece, noting that "each one of the scenes is included within two pilasters and an arch".

== Attribution ==
Panofsky dates the altarpiece to after 1450, based on the similarity of the left-hand panel to Andrea Pisano's relief; Rogier may have seen it during his visit to Italy that year. Dendrochronological examination dates the wood as ready for use as a panel painting at about 1454. Most art historians see the altarpiece as inextricably linked with the Miraflores Altarpiece, thus associating it with van der Weyden. Panofsky described them as "almost indistinguishable" in style and quality. Later, Shirley Blum wrote that "the two altarpieces are as alike formally as they are in devotional character ... one should examine more closely the possibility that they originally came from the same place". Victoria Reed considers the similarities so pronounced that it is highly probable that the two were intended to hang together at the Miraflores monastery.

== Gallery ==
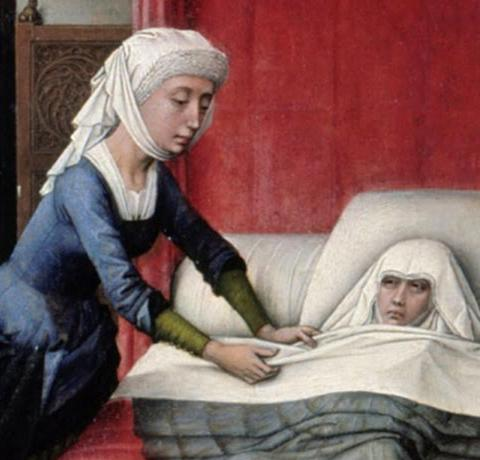
Nurse attending John's mother Elizabeth in the left-hand panel

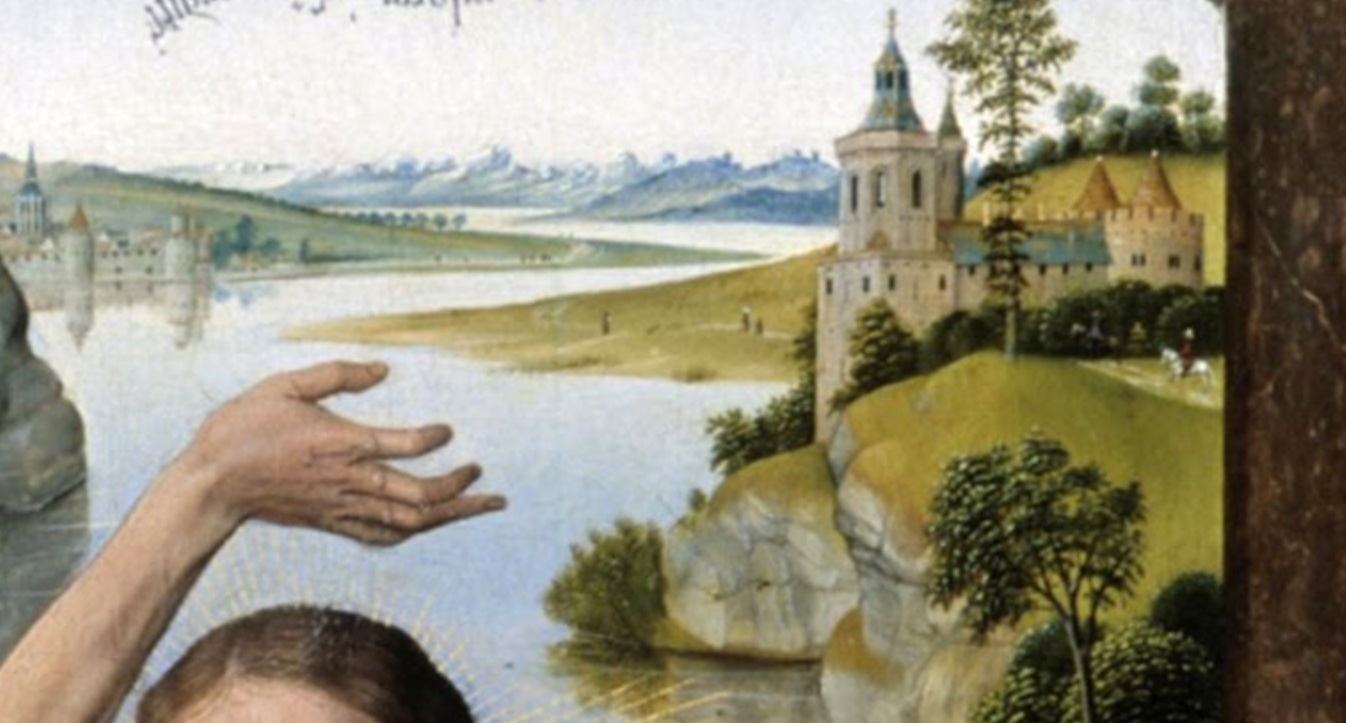
Detail of the landscape behind Christ

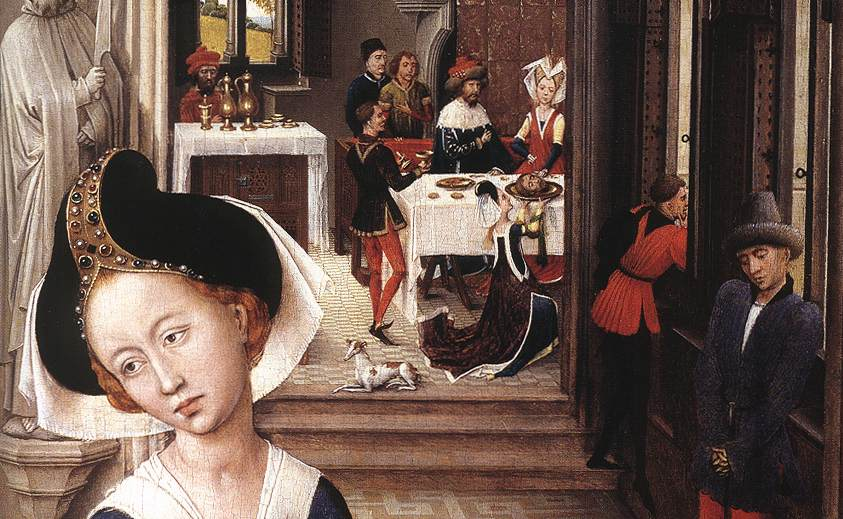
Detail of the figures behind Salome

== See also ==
- List of works by Rogier van der Weyden

== Sources ==
- Acres, Alfred. "The Columba Altarpiece and the Time of the World". The Art Bulletin, Volume 80, No. 3, 1998. 422–51
- Blum, Shirley. Early Netherlandish Triptychs: A Study in Patronage. Los Angeles: University of California Press, 1969.
- Campbell, Lorne. Van der Weyden. London: Chaucer Press, 2004. ISBN 1-904449-24-7
- Jacobs, Lynn. Opening Doors: The Early Netherlandish Triptych Reinterpreted. University Park, PA: Pennsylvania State University Press, 2011. ISBN 0-271-04840-9
- Lane, Barbara. "Rogier's Saint John and Miraflores Altarpieces Reconsidered". The Art Bulletin, Volume 60, No. 4, December, pp. 655–672, 1978.
- Panofsky, Erwin. Early Netherlandish Painting, Its Origin and Character. Cambridge, MA, 1953
- Reed, Victoria. "Rogier van der Weyden's "Saint John Triptych" for Miraflores and a Reconsideration of Salome". Oud Holland, Volume 115, No. 1, 2001/2002
- Soudavar, Abolala. Decoding Old Masters: Patrons, Princes and Enigmatic Paintings of the 15th Century. I. B. Tauris, 2008. ISBN 1-84511-658-5
