= Miraflores Altarpiece =

Painting by Rogier van der Weyden

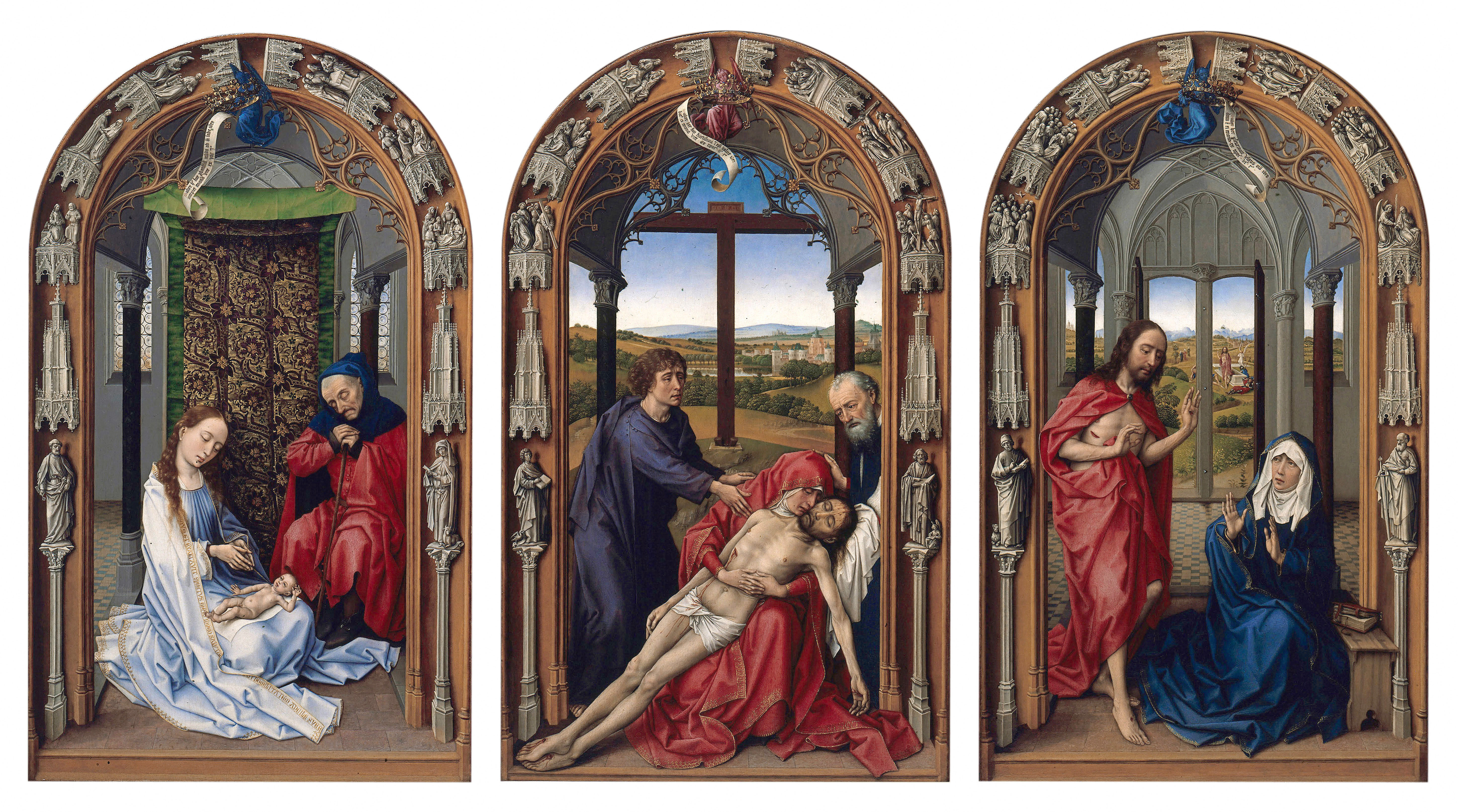
- Artist: Rogier van der Weyden
- Year: c. 1442-5
- Type: Oil on oak panel
- Dimensions: 220.5 cm × 259.5 cm (86.8 in × 102.2 in)
- Location: Gemäldegalerie, Berlin

The Miraflores Altarpiece (or Triptych of the Virgin, or The Altar of Our Lady or the Mary Altarpiece) is a c. 1442-5 oil-on-oak wood panel altarpiece by the Early Netherlandish painter Rogier van der Weyden, in the Gemäldegalerie, Berlin since 1850.

The altarpiece examines Mary's relationship with Christ at different stages of his life. The panels show, from left to right, a portrait of the Holy Family, a Pietà (the Virgin cradling the dead body of Jesus) and Christ's appearance to Mary—a chronological reading of the birth, death and resurrection of Jesus, with Mary the focus of both wings.

It is notable for its use of colour, distinguished by its use of whites, reds and blues, and use of line—notably the line of Christ's body in the central panel—and, typically of van der Weyden, its emotional impact. Typical of triptychs from the period, the altarpiece is rich in religious symbolism; each panel is framed by a rounded arch with Gothic decorations in open tracery below and in the spandrel. Each is lined with highly detailed simulated relief sculptures, with complicated iconography. The altarpiece influenced contemporary painters, especially in the use of symbolically decorated portals placed as imaginary reliefs in the framing arches. It informed works by Petrus Christus, Dirk Bouts and Hans Memling.

== The triptych ==
=== Overview ===
Each panel is framed by an arch or doorway and seems to be positioned within church portals, in interior spaces that give the appearance of taking place on a stage. The front of each frame contains the facing of a step, which, according to art historian Jeffrey Chipps Smith, implies "the viewer's proximity to, and potential for imaginatively entering into, the divine stage." In contrast to most triptychs of the time, the panels were originally fixed and not hinged, although they were later broken apart and reassembled as movable. Each is remarkably free of the pictorial traditions generally used when depicting these episodes. The Holy Family panel shows none of the other figures usually represented in pictures of the birth or infancy of Christ. Many of the elements are van der Weyden's own inventions; for example, the winding path in the right panel does not refer to any previous representation or biblical text. It is a temporal device to link the resurrected Christ with the figure who appears before Mary.

The different colours of Mary's robes in each panel bear symbolic meaning; the white, red and blues are intended to depict her three traditional virtues; respectively purity, compassion and perseverance. She is shown in pure white in the family panel to underscore her perpetual virginity, in red (a predominant colour in the triptych) as she mourns her son, and in blue as he reappears to her.

The framing arch of each panel is historiated, containing a series of small but highly detailed and symbolic protruding or raised marble statues which augment the narrative of the particular episode from Christ's life. The triptych is often associated with van der Weyden's other John the Baptist altarpiece as both utilise imagined stone reliefs both as framing devices and as a means to develop on the main theme of the particular panel. The arches are painted in browns, likely to give the appearance of timber. They are fantastic rather than realistic, serving as a device to include the small relief figures located in the archivolts which reflect on and accentuate the narrative and theme of the panel on which they appear.

=== Panels ===
The left-hand wing shows Mary dressed in a violet-white robe, looking at the infant Christ as he returns her gaze. Beside them a seated Saint Joseph is dressed in red with a long head-dress, dozing as he leans on a staff. The hem of Mary's robe is inscribed in golden script containing text from the "Canticle of Mary" of Luke 1:46–48.; My soul doth magnify the Lord.... This panel was long assumed to be a Nativity until described by art historian Erwin Panofsky as a simple representation of the Holy Family. The accompanying reliefs show moments of the Life of Christ; key events from his infancy to the Presentation at the Temple.

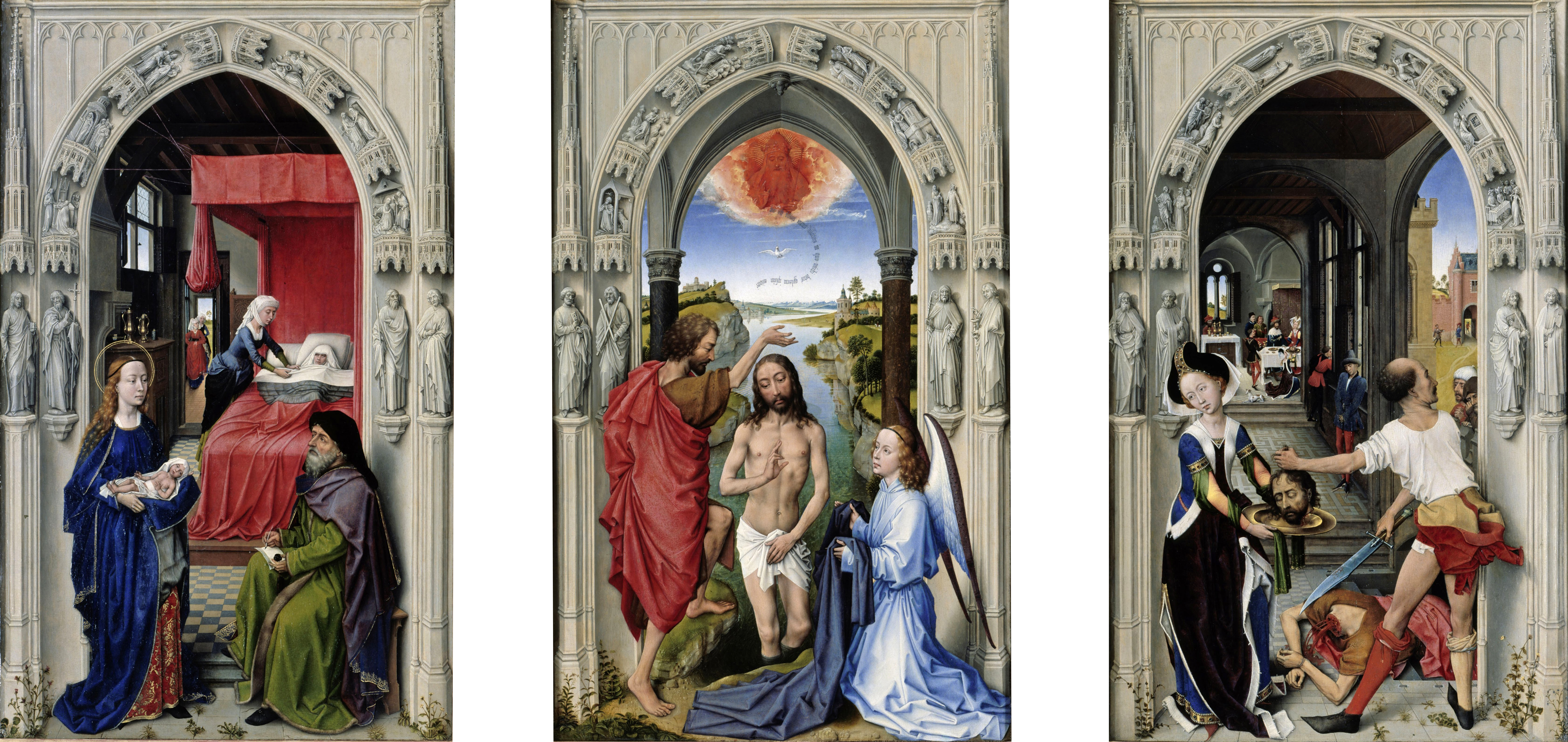
Van der Weyden's c. 1455 Saint John Altarpiece. Gemäldegalerie, Berlin. This triptych is linked to the Miraflores in its shared symbolic motifs, most notably the winding pathway, doorway and perspective tiles.

In the centre panel, Mary is shown in a red robe holding Christ's lifeless long body. Saint Peter and Luke the Evangelist stand on either side of her. Both are dressed in black clothes and represent the foundation of the early Church and the Gospels, respectively. The right-hand panel shows the moment (not in any of the Gospels) when Christ appears to his mother after his Resurrection, which is repeated at a smaller scale in the distance through the open doorway at rear. Although van der Weyden had otherwise presented the chronology of the triptych from left to right, the background resurrection is to the right of the Appearance in the foreground. The sequence is suggested by the picture's depth (in that the scene in the foreground is chronologically the more recent), and by the long winding path that leads from the tomb to the interior.

The artist uses a number of pictorial devices to suggest the approach of the risen Christ, including the winding path, the doors which open inwards, and the exterior light falling on the interior tiles. The archway reliefs include representations of the Old Testament antecedents to The Passion, including the Death of Absalom and the Binding of Isaac.

The panels are in good condition and have not suffered significant damage. They were cleaned in 1981 when layers of discoloured and ruined varnishes were removed. Technical examination shows that Rogier made a number of changes to the final poses.

== Versions, authenticity and provenance ==
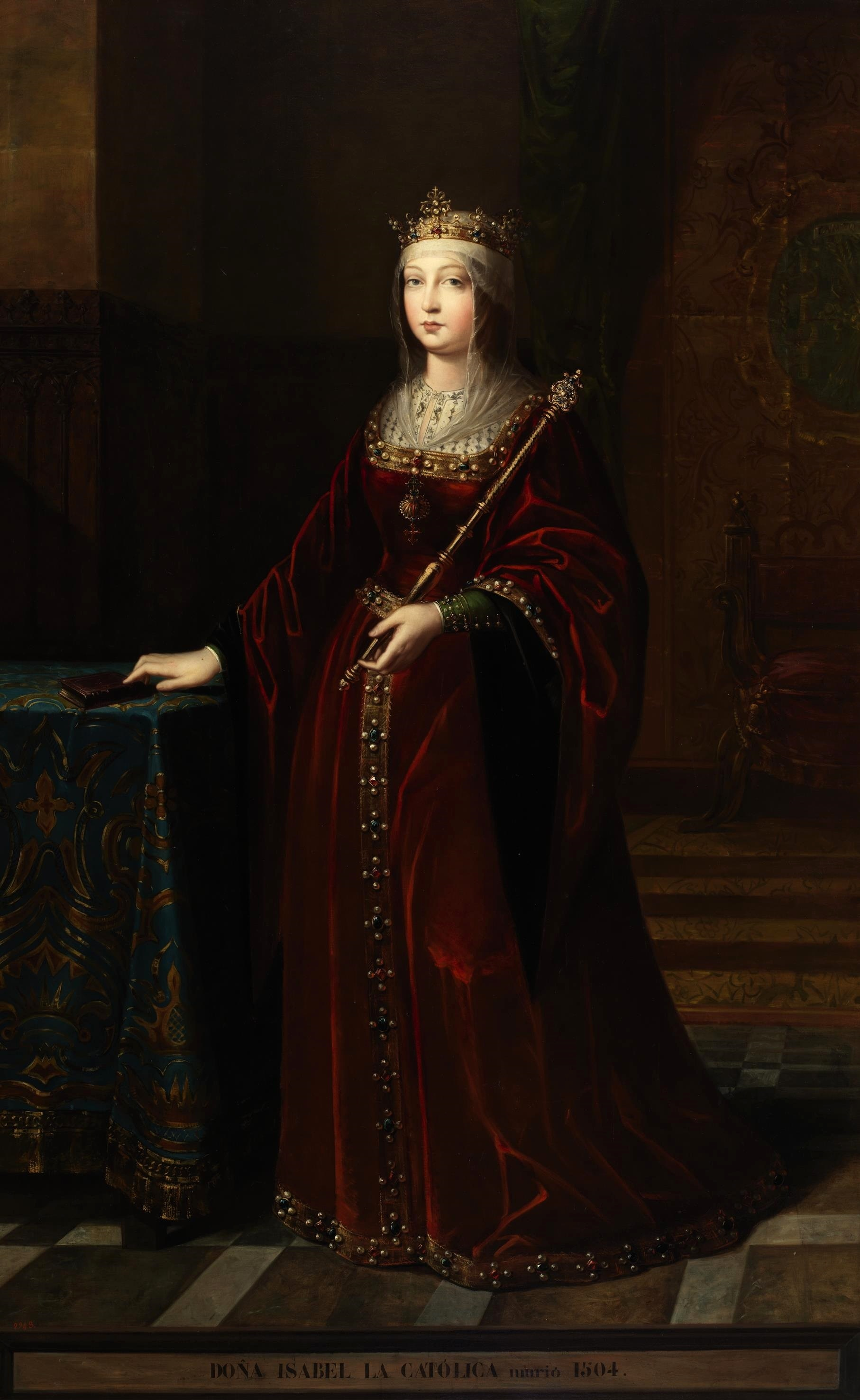
Posthumous portrait of Queen Isabel of Castile. Her father John II knew Jan van Eyck who had died by the time the painting was commissioned. Instead, John enlisted van der Weyden. It is believed that Isabel was so impressed by the work that she, in turn, commissioned a copy (now in New York) from a member of van der Weyden's workshop or a follower.

Two nearly identical but slightly smaller copies survive, in the Metropolitan Museum of Art, New York and in the Royal Chapel of Granada. This Berlin original comes from the collection of Isabella I of Castile and was long thought to be the original of the two. As late as 1956, art historian Max Friedlænder wrote that "since the Granada version became known, the Berlin replica has been ignored as of no importance. The Berlin altarpiece is unusually well-preserved; it is in some respects inferior to the Granada work but can hardly be other than an extremely careful and highly successful workshop replica." More recent studies of the under-drawing and paint show that the Granada/New York version was executed after the Berlin panels, while dendrochronological examination of the oak carried out in 1982 dates it after 1492; van der Weyden is known to have died in 1464. Study of the Berlin work reveals a heartwood ring from 1406 and approximates a felling date for the timber in the early 1420s.

The Altarpiece was stolen by General Darmagnac during the Peninsular War, as a part of the Napoleonic looting of art in Spain. The triptych was largely forgotten and ignored until the early 20th century. It was not identified as a van der Weyden until attributed in the early 1950s by Max Friedlænder in his pioneering 14-volume Masterpieces of Netherlandish painting of the 15th and 16th centuries. The attribution came from the verification of a 1445 document describing the triptych as of the hand of "the great and famous Fleming Rogel". The Granada and New York versions, until this point considered originals, were recognised as copies, now thought made around 1500 by a Castile painter who most likely served his apprentiship in the Low Countries. It has been suggested that both come from Juan de Flandes, but there is no conclusive proof. Panofsky, also writing in the 1950s, expanded on Friedlænder's work and detailed the complex iconography of the altarpiece.

Further, infrared reflectography shows that changes were made to the composition before its completion, proving that it is not the work of a copyist. The triptych was commissioned by Isabella's father John II, who donated it to the Miraflores Carthusian monastery near Burgos, Spain, around 1445. Most likely, Isabella ordered a copy of the Berlin work as such altarpieces were then "prized for their spiritual powers or for the status of their authorship and/or ownership".
