= Virgin and Child with Saints Barbara and Catherine =

Painting by Quentin Matsys

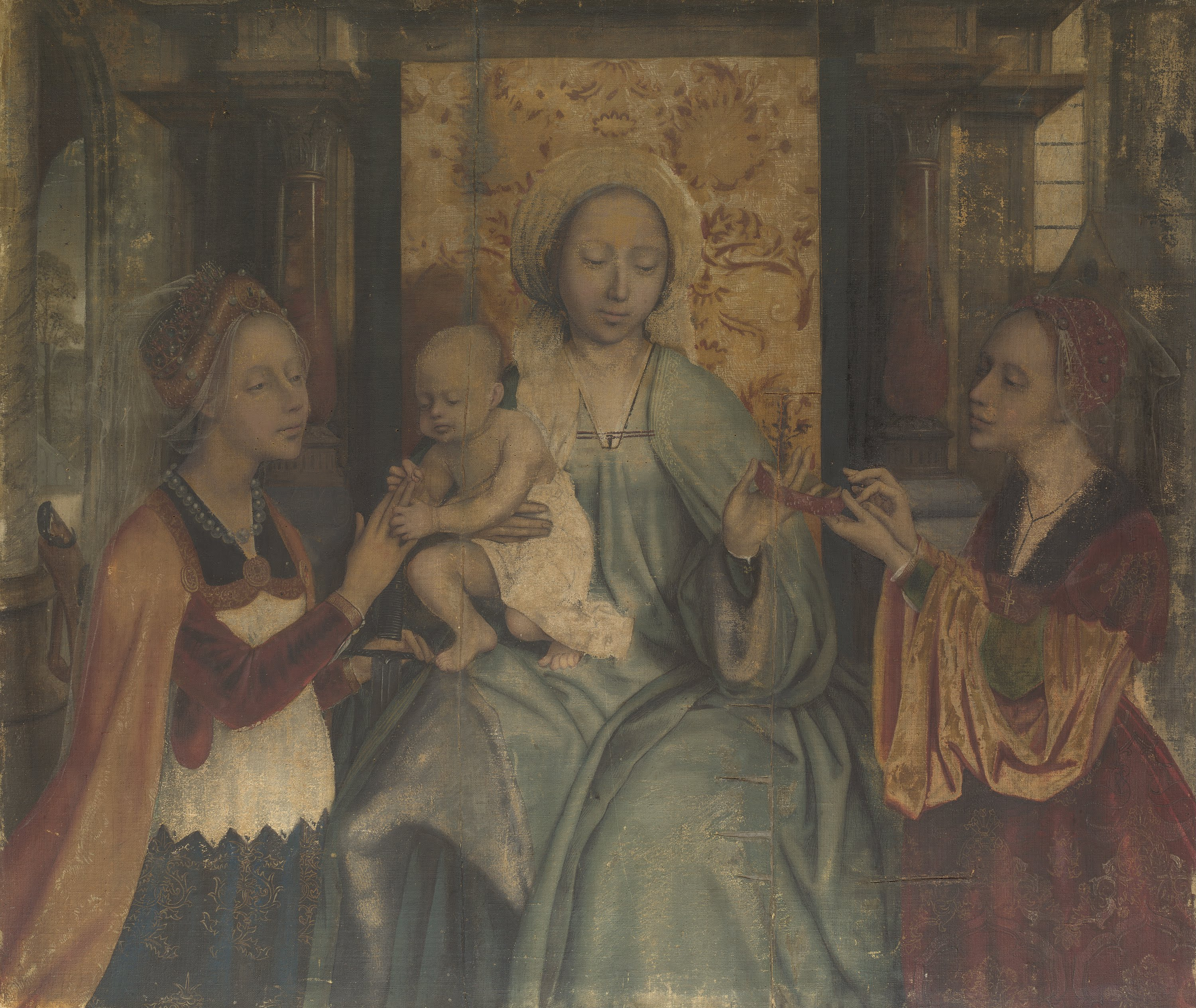
Virgin and Child with Saints Barbara and Catherine, Quentin Matsys, 92.7cm x 110cm, c. 1515–1525 National Gallery, London.

Virgin and Child with Saints Barbara and Catherine is a glue-size on linen painting by Flemish artist Quentin Matsys, probably painted c. 1515–1525. The Virgin Mary is shown on a throne, holding the Infant Jesus, between Barbara and Catherine of Alexandria, two saints popular in the early 16th century and considered the most important of the venerated Fourteen Holy Helpers. Jesus leans forward to place a ring on Catherine's finger, a reference to her vision in which she was to given Jesus by Mary in mystical marriage. Other indicators of the saints identities include the broken wheel - which refers to the torture of Catherine- and the tower, an allusion to Barbara's imprisonment and eventual beheading at the hands of her father.

Because of the high perishability of linen cloth and the solubility of the hide glue used as a binder, this work, along with Dirk Bouts' Entombment (c. 1440–55), is rare surviving example of the technique. It is badly damaged and darkened by exposure to light and accumulated layers of surface dirt. The dirt cannot be cleaned by restorers for fear of substantial removal of pigment.

Some effects of texture and light are still discernible, including contrast of the sharp highlights of Catherine's head-dress against the duller highlights of her necklace. The painting was built up in a two-stage process where layers of darker pigments over which progressively lighter tones were added. For example, Catherine's dress began with an underlayer of dark blue over which a lines of brighter blue was added to create the illusion of vertical folds in the cloth. This technique of dark to light is the opposite to the general approach with oils where darker colours are layered on lighter pigments. Infrared photography reveals an underdrawing and a black layer of underpaint.

The painting was donated to the National Gallery in London in 1922 by Charles Bridger Orme Clarke.

== Bibliography ==
- Ashok, Roy. The Technique of a 'Tüchlein' by Quinten Massys. National Gallery Technical Bulletin, Volume 12, 36–43
- Jones, Susan Frances. Van Eyck to Gossaert. National Gallery, 2011. ISBN 978-1-85709-504-3
