= The Wine of Saint Martin's Day =

Painting by Pieter Bruegel the Elder

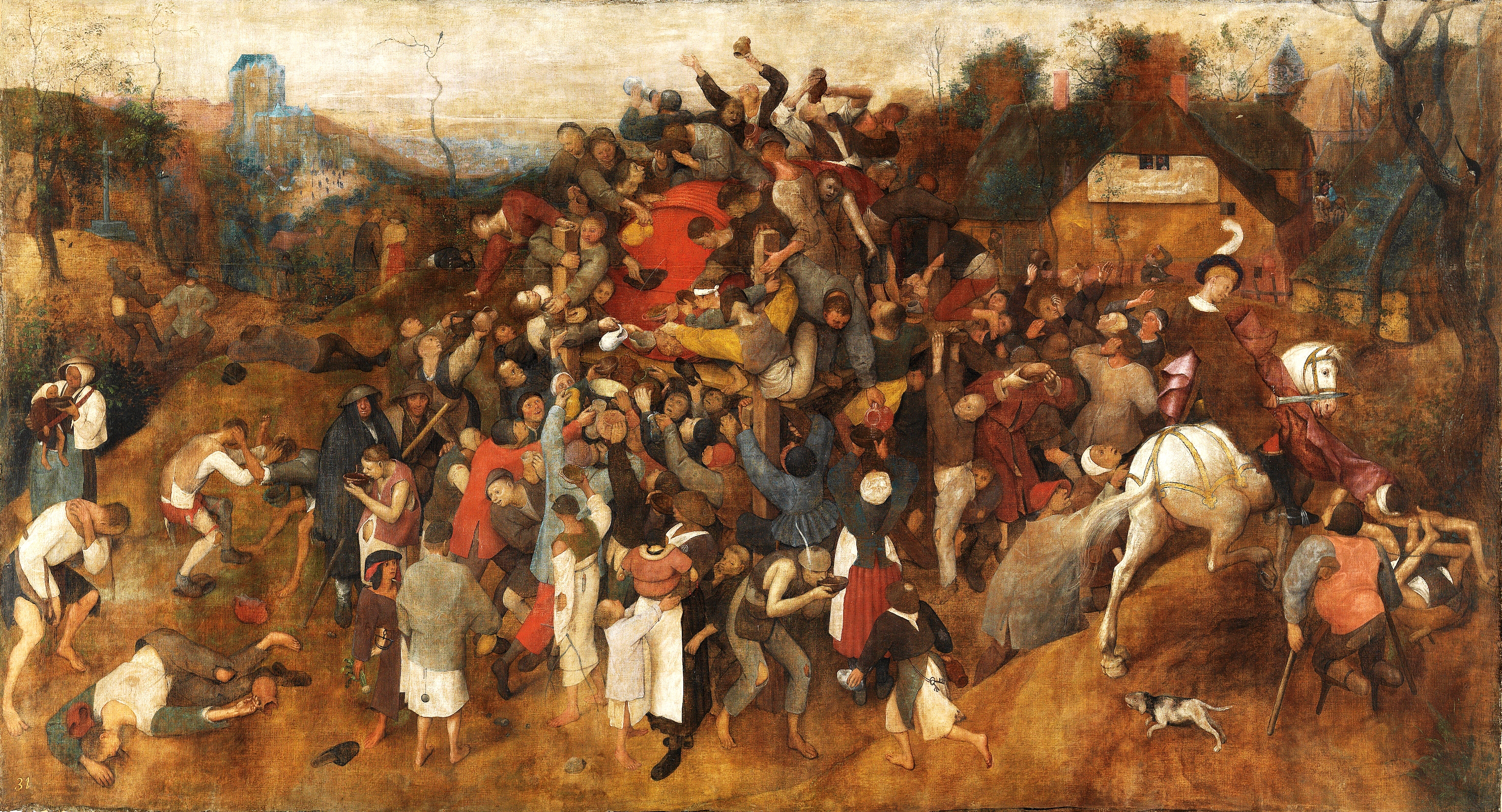
- Artist: Pieter Bruegel the Elder
- Year: c. 1565–1568
- Type: Glue-size tempera on linen
- Dimensions: 148 cm × 270.5 cm (4 ft 10 in × 8 ft 10 in)
- Location: Museo del Prado; Madrid

The Wine of Saint Martin's Day is the largest painting by the Northern Renaissance artist Pieter Bruegel the Elder. It is currently held in the Museo del Prado, Madrid, where it was identified as a Bruegel original in 2010. Like much of Bruegel's work it depicts peasant life, in this case a festival known as St. Martin's Day, which involves drinking the first wine of the season.

== Description of painting ==
The picture depicts a popular festival celebrated on 11 November. Although it is not a religious painting as such, it contains references to Christianity. There is a roadside cross, which the peasants seemingly ignore, and among the many figures is a group which alludes to the legend of St Martin of Tours dividing his cloak to share it with a beggar. This idea of having an important theme relegated to the side of the painting is paralleled in, for example, Landscape with the Fall of Icarus, which also highlights ordinary events.

The picture has been dated on stylistic grounds to the 1560s. It is one of several surviving works by this artist executed in glue-size on linen (Tüchlein). By the early twenty-first century, when its owners took it to the Prado for restoration, the painting was not in a good state of conservation . This is not surprising as the fragile medium tends to cause conservation problems. (On the other hand, The Blind Leading the Blind, one of the other Bruegels in this medium, is in relatively good condition). After restoration, the painting was put on public display in the Prado.

== Provenance ==
The work was identified as a Bruegel in 2010 at the Museo del Prado in Madrid. A study of the surface using X-rays revealed fragments of Bruegel's signature, thereby confirming his authorship. It was subsequently acquired by the Prado for less than its value on the open market.

The Wine of Saint Martin's Day matches the description of a painting which was inventoried in the collection of the Gonzaga dukes of Mantua in the early seventeenth century. However, there is some doubt as to whether the painting in Mantua was the painting now in the Prado. It might, for example, have been a related painting now in Vienna's Kunsthistorisches Museum, which shows the group around St Martin. The earliest documentary evidence which definitely relates to the work now in the Prado Museum is an inventory of the collection of a Spanish aristocrat, Luis Francisco de la Cerda, the ninth duke of Medinaceli. The inventory was drawn up after the duke's death in the early eighteenth century: he is assumed to have acquired the painting in Italy around the end of the seventeenth century.

== See also ==
- List of paintings by Pieter Bruegel the Elder
