= The Grand Teddy tea-rooms paintings =

Three oval paintings by Édouard Vuillard

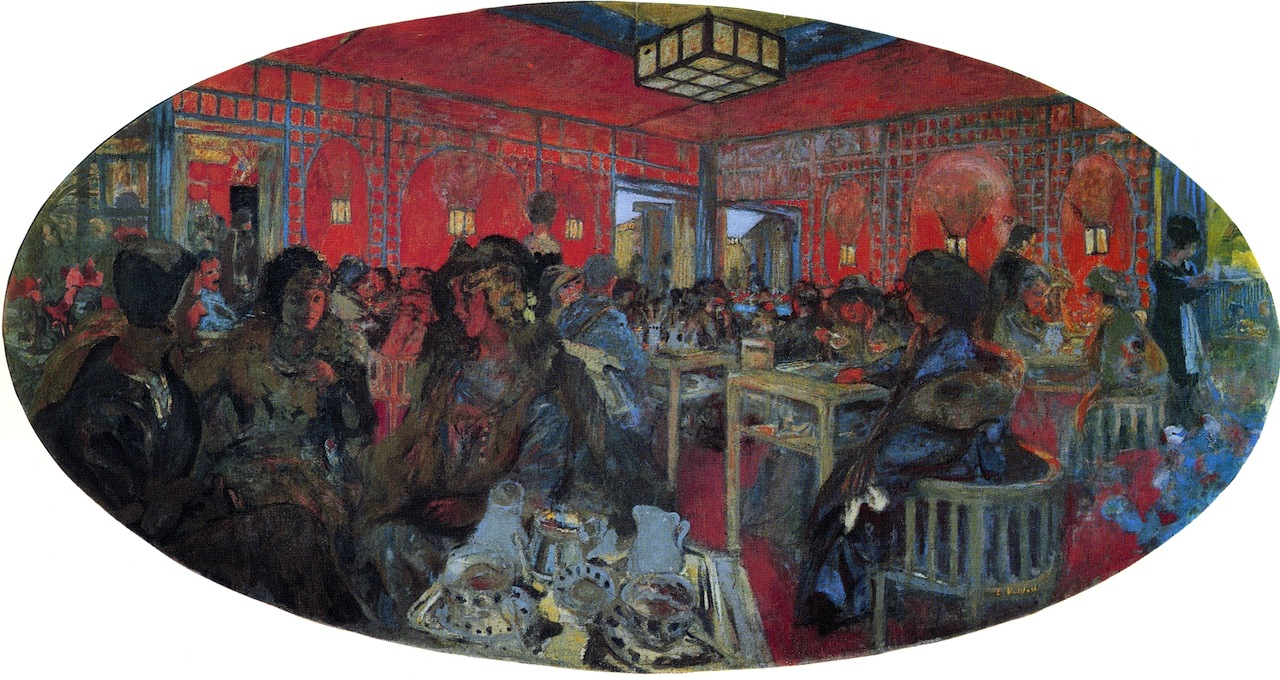
Le Grand Teddy (1918) by Édouard Vuillard

The Grand Teddy tea-rooms paintings is a collective name for three glue distemper oval paintings executed by Édouard Vuillard for Le Grand Teddy tea-rooms in Paris in 1918. The largest is privately owned, but is sometimes exhibited. One of the smaller works (identified in Vuillard's notes as The Cafe) was featured on an episode of the BBC television programme Fake or Fortune? which first broadcast on 19 January 2014. The location of the third (called The Oysters in Vuillard's notes) is currently unknown.

== Origin ==
The Grand Teddy tea-rooms paintings are three oval paintings in glue distemper on canvas by Édouard Vuillard commissioned by interior designer Francis Jourdain to hang on the walls of the Grand Teddy bar and cafe in Paris. They were painted in 1918. With the closure of the cafe in 1922, the paintings were bought by Jos Hessel, Vuillard's friend and art dealer.

== Subsequent history ==
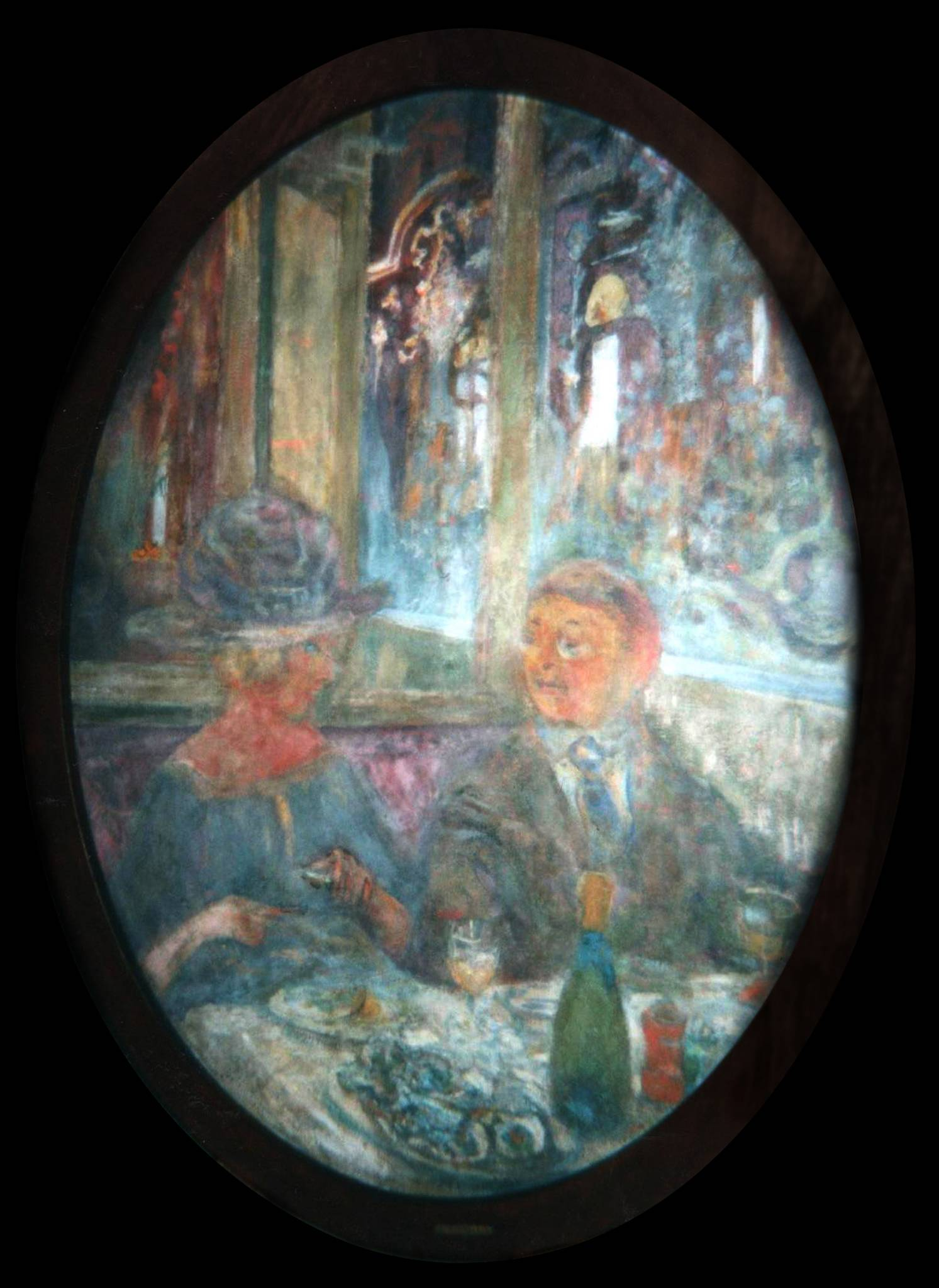
The Oysters (1918) by Edouard Vuillard

The largest (called Le Grand Teddy) shows the fashionable patrons of the cafe. It was exhibited at the Jewish Museum in New York City in May, 2012. It is 150 x 290 cm in an oval shape in landscape format. It is privately owned and only occasionally seen in public.

Nearly five feet high and over eleven-and-a-half feet wide, Le Grand Teddy was accompanied by two smaller ovals, identified in the painter's notes as The Cafe and The Oysters. Standing four feet high in portrait orientation, neither appeared in the Vuillard catalogue raisonné when the paintings were acquired as a pair by art dealer Robert Warren. In 2005 he sold The Oysters on eBay for £3,000. In 2007, The Café was sold on for £11,000 by "a Suffolk family" at TW Gaze in Diss, Norfolk.

Depicting a number of ladies seated at a banquette, The Café was re-examined for the BBC programme Fake or Fortune? by the Wildenstein Institute and authenticated by unanimous decision of its Vuillard Committee. Estimated to be worth £250,000, The Café remains with 2007 purchaser Keith Tutt and will be included in subsequent print editions of the catalogue raisonné.

Its mate The Oysters carries the same estimated value. Depicting a couple seated to champagne and oysters, its whereabouts remain unknown, as the dealer Warren has been unable to identify its purchaser.

== BBC's Fake or Fortune? ==
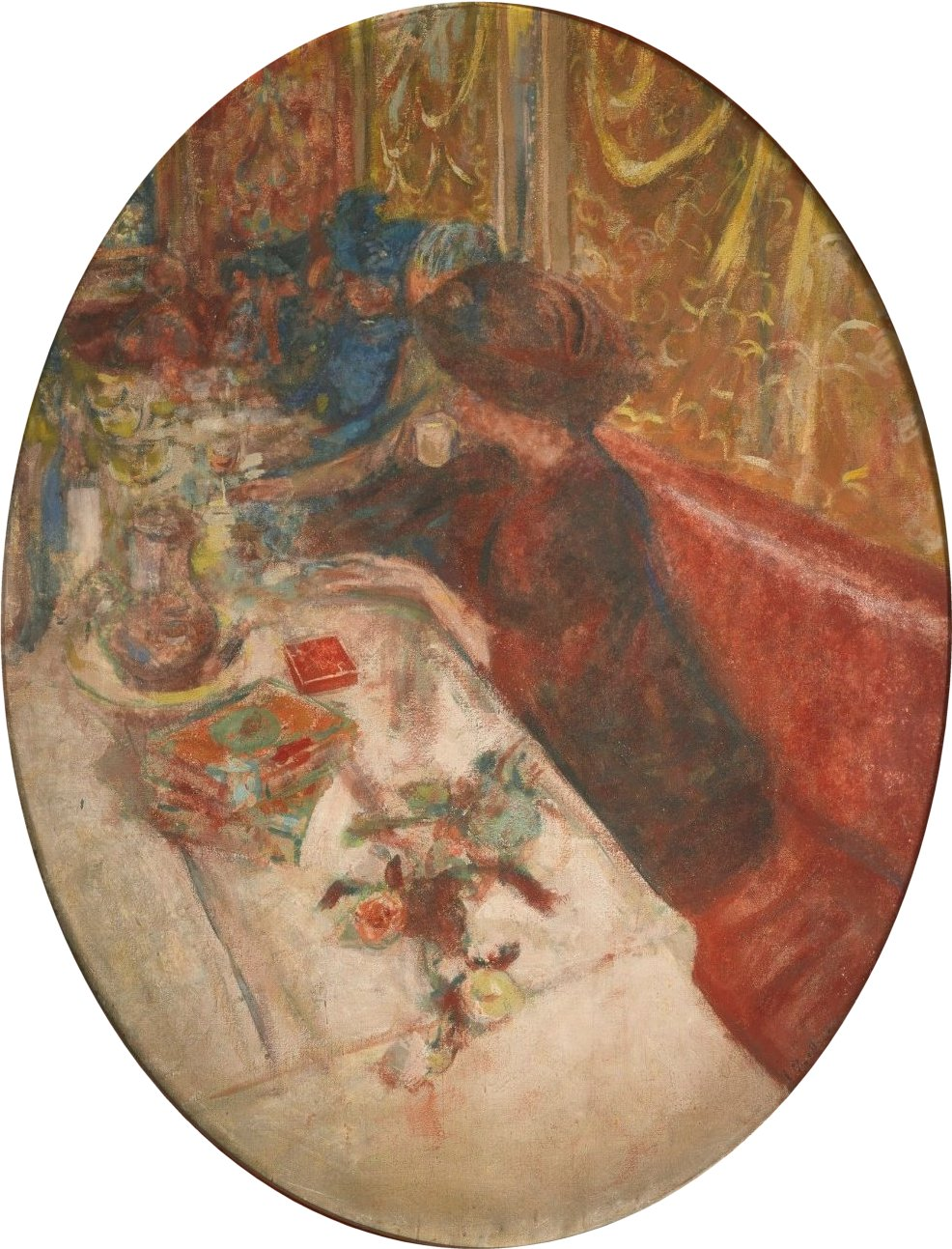
The Café (1918) by Edouard Vuillard

Keith Tutt, an author and scriptwriter from Norfolk, fell in love with the work of French post-Impressionist painter Édouard Vuillard and purchased a painting, thought to be one of the two smaller Grand Teddy works, at auction for approximately £11,000. He contacted the BBC programme Fake or Fortune?, in an attempt to gain their help in authenticating his work.

Tutt's vertical oval painting, titled The Café, depicts an oblique elevated view of a café interior, with a group of women seated on a banquette. It was thought to be one of the three paintings commissioned from Vuillard in 1918 to decorate "Le Grand Teddy". The main painting of the commission, Le Grand Teddy, is currently privately owned and kept in secure storage in Geneva, Switzerland, and, at the time the programme was made, was the only one of the three known to still exist, and to have been fully confirmed as a genuine Vuillard. With assistance from art experts and archivists in Britain, France and the Netherlands, the programme undertook an exhaustive investigation and analysis of the Tutt painting, and they were given special permission by the owners of Le Grand Teddy to examine it and take minute samples of the paint and canvas for scientific analysis. This showed that both paintings were virtually identical, both in the type of canvas used, and the medium with which Vuillard had painted the works. This was a relatively unusual compound of animal glue and pigment, called glue distemper, which Vuillard had learned to use in his early career, while working as a theatrical scenery painter. He was thought to have chosen glue distemper for the Grand Teddy commission in part because its unvarnished matte surface did not reflect the bright electric lights then coming into common use.

The programme's team was also able to visit the Bibliotheque Nationale in Paris, where they discovered the original interior design drawings for Le Grand Teddy, showing how the paintings would have been placed. An investigation of the provenance traced the ownership back from Tutt, through Robert Warren and a previous owner, to British theatrical manager Charles Cochran and artist and theatrical designer Doris Zinkeisen, from whose estate the "Suffolk couple" that was to put them up for auction purchased them. Following the clue provided by a damaged shipping label on the back of The Café, the programme was finally able to locate contemporary Dutch newspaper reviews from 1926, which described both paintings in great detail, and thus confirming that after the Grand Teddy had closed, Vuillard's dealer Jos Hessel had placed the two smaller paintings in an exhibition in the Netherlands, from where they were thought to have been seen and purchased by Cochran.

Tutt and the Fake or Fortune? team submitted the evidence to a committee at the Wildenstein Institute in Paris, which unanimously agreed The Café to be a genuine work, and that it would henceforward be incorporated into the catalogue raisonné of Vuillard. As a result of this validation, the painting was estimated to be worth at least £200,000–£300,000.

== The missing work ==
Following their Fake or Fortune programme, the BBC issued an appeal to trace the missing third painting, purchased on eBay in 2005 and now with an estimated value of £250,000.
