= Distemper (paint) =

Form of decorative paint

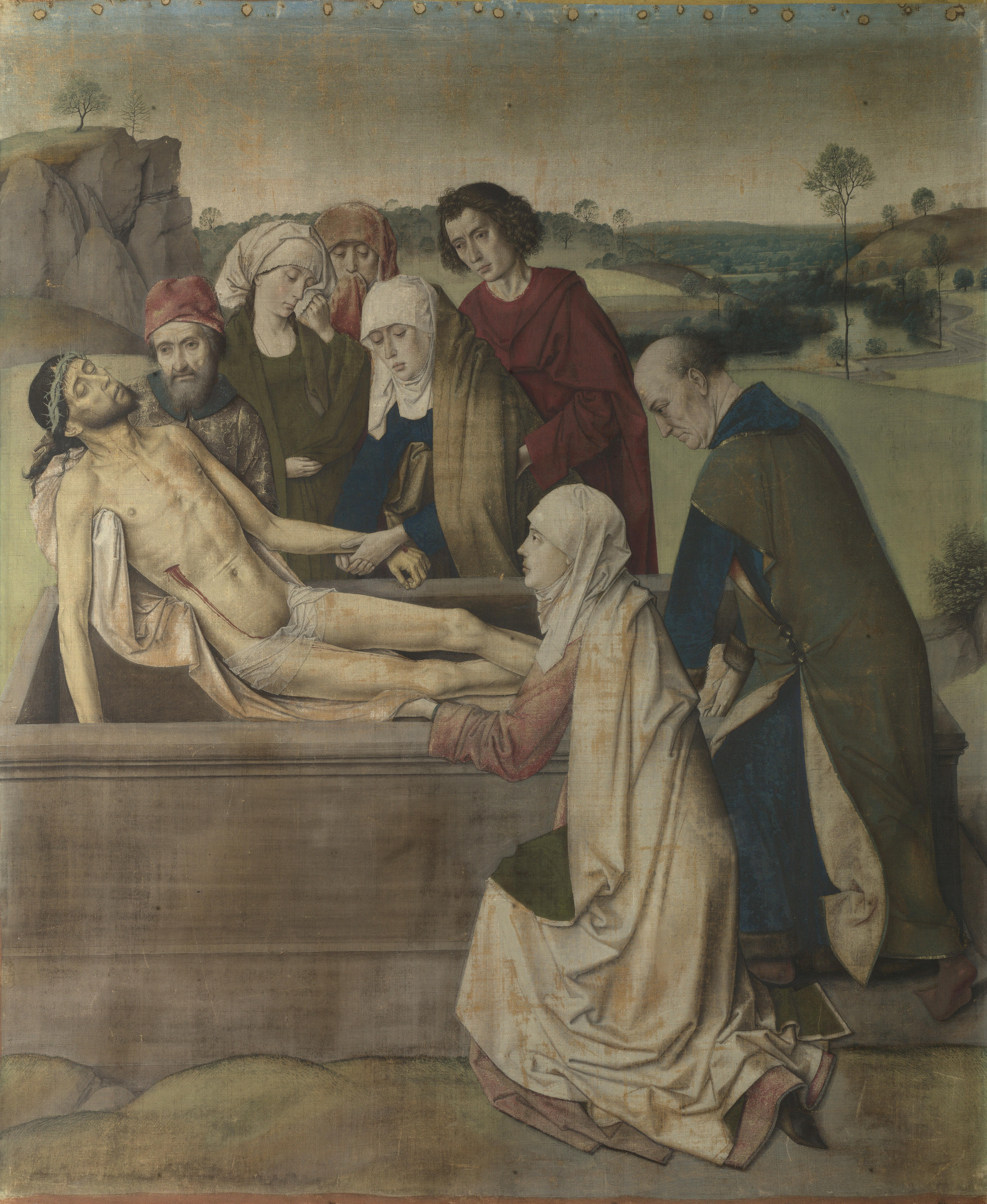
Dirk Bouts' Entombment, distemper on linen, 1450s

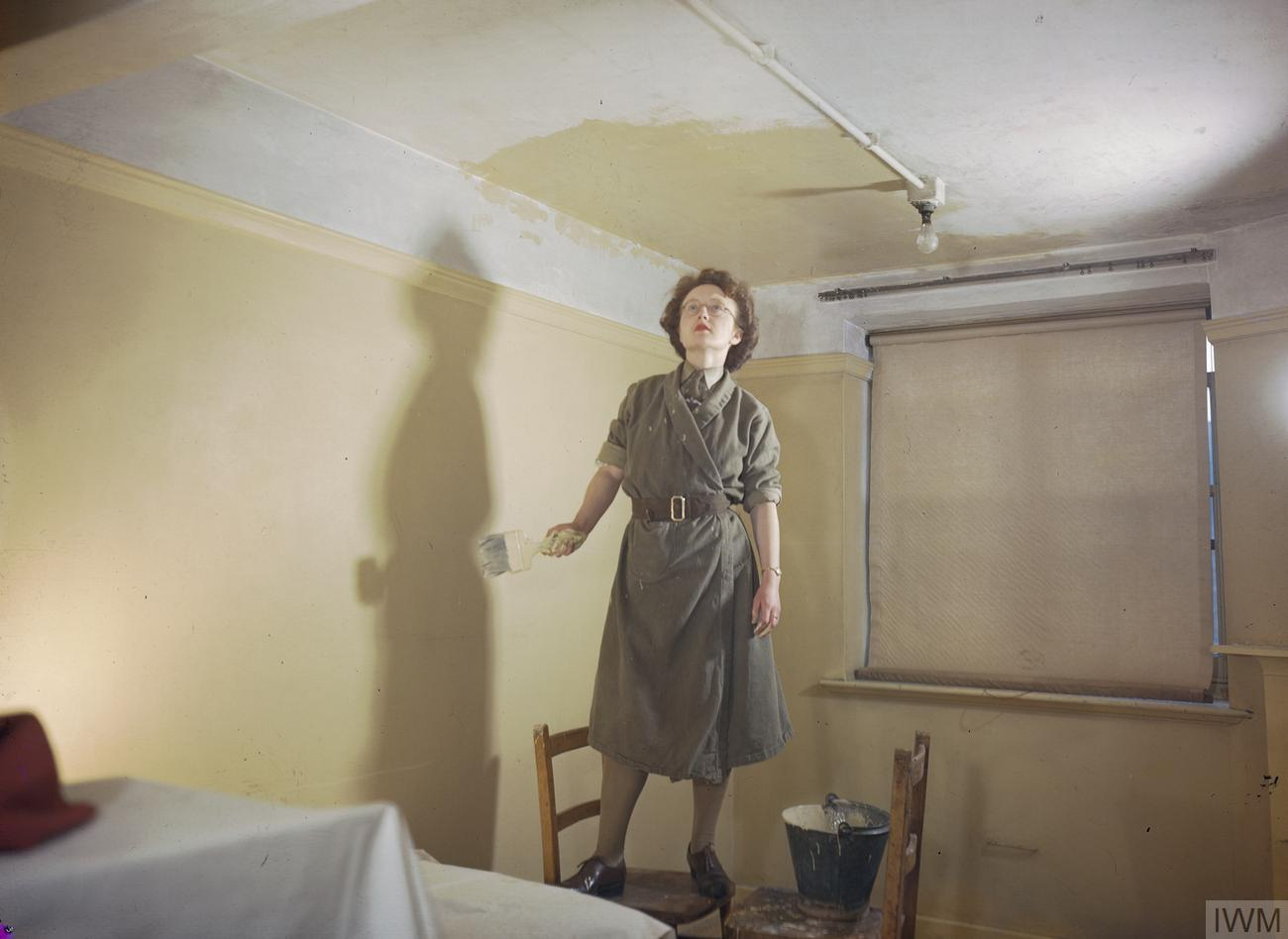
Distemper being used to paint a room, 1939-1945

Distemper is a decorative paint and a historical medium for painting pictures, and contrasted with tempera. The binder may be glues of vegetable or animal origin (excluding egg). Soft distemper is not abrasion resistant and may include binders such as chalk, ground pigments, and animal glue. Hard distemper is stronger and wear-resistant and can include casein or linseed oil as binders.

== Soft distemper ==
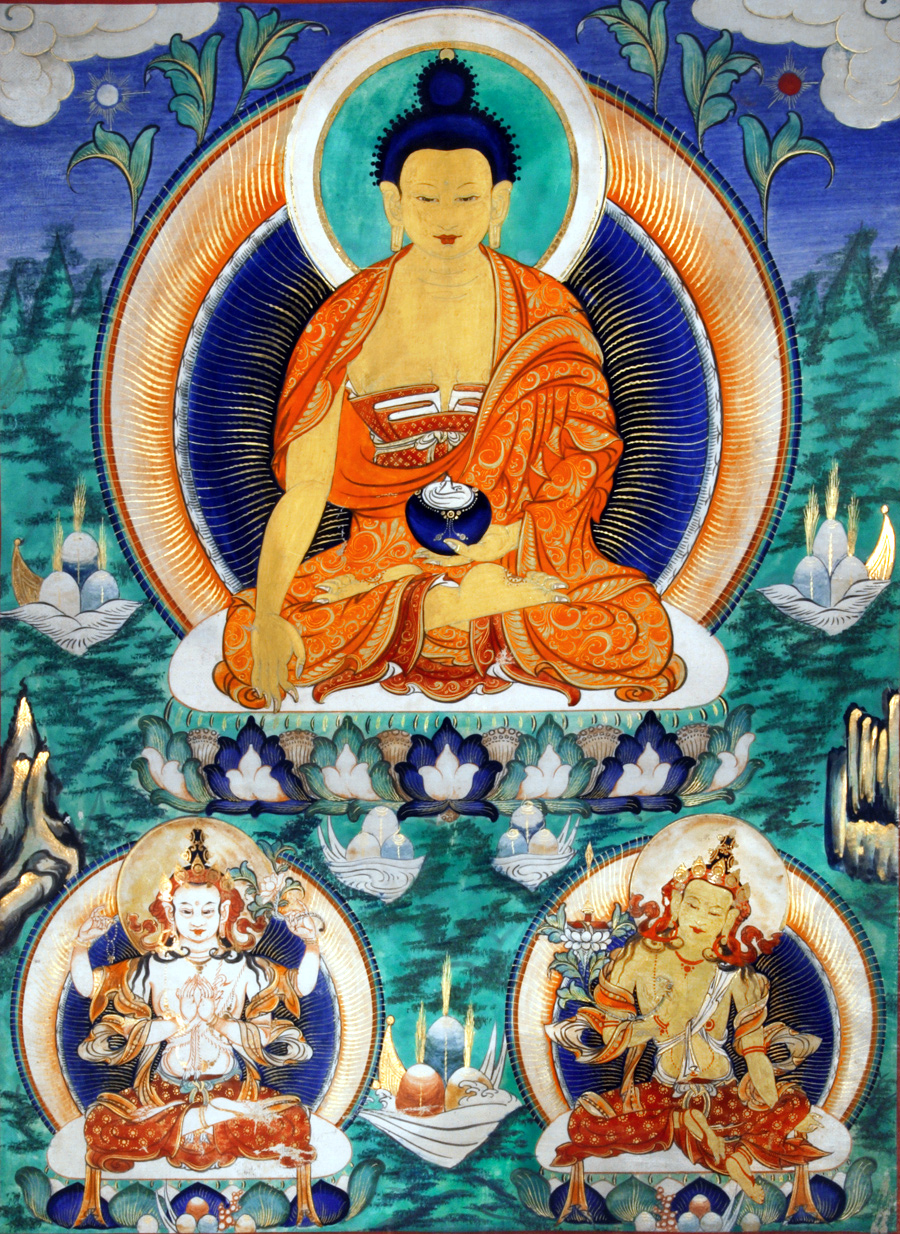
19th-century Mongolian thanka in distemper

Distemper is an early form of whitewash, also used as a medium for artistic painting, usually made from powdered chalk or lime and size (a gelatinous substance). Alternatives to chalk include the toxic substance white lead.

Distempered surfaces can be easily marked and discoloured, and cannot be washed down, so distemper is best suited to temporary and interior decoration. The technique of painting on distempered surfaces blends watercolours with whiting and glue. "The colours are mixed with whitening, or finely-ground chalk, and tempered with size. The whitening makes them opaque and gives them 'body,' but is also the cause of their drying light ... a source of considerable embarrassment to the inexperienced eye is that the colours when wet present such a different appearance from what they do when dry."

Many Medieval and Renaissance painters used distemper painting rather than oil paint for some of their works. The earliest paintings on canvas were mostly in distemper, which was (and is) also widely used in Asia, especially in Tibetan thankas. Distemper paintings suffer more than oil paintings as they age, and relatively few have survived. It was the most common medium for painting banners and decorations for temporary celebrations, both of which attracted artists of the highest quality, especially when they were official court artists. In distemper painting, "the carbonate of lime, or whitening employed as a basis, is less active than the pure lime of fresco ... to give adhesion to the tints and colours in distemper painting, and to make them keep their place, they are variously mixed with the size of glue (prepared commonly by dissolving about four ounces [110 g] of glue in an imperial gallon [4.5 L; 1.2 US gal] of water). Too much of the glue disposes the painting to crack and peel from the ground; while, with too little, it is friable and deficient in strength."

The National Gallery, London, distinguishes between the techniques of glue, glue size, or glue-tempera, which is how they describe their three Andrea Mantegnas in the medium, and distemper, which is how they describe their Dirk Bouts and two Édouard Vuillards (see below). Other sources would describe the Mantegnas as also being in distemper.

In modern practice, distemper painting is often employed for scenery painting in theatrical productions and other short-term applications, where it may be preferred to oil paint for reasons of economy. Contemporary artist John Connell was known for using distemper in paintings sometimes as large as ten feet.

In architecture, distemper paints usually consist of a glue binder with calcium carbonate as the base pigment.

== Military use ==
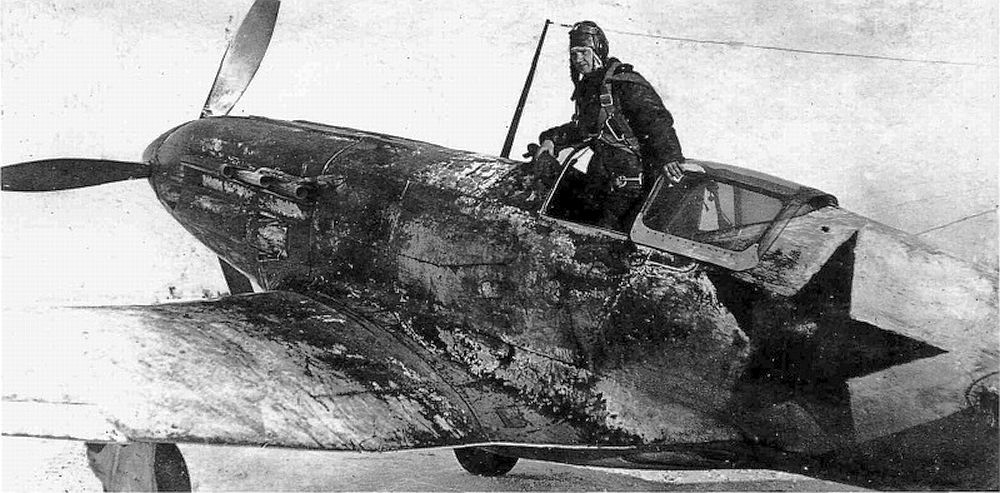
The distemper winter camouflage paint on this Soviet MiG-3 fighter aeroplane shows severe erosion due to weathering.

Distemper was used extensively by German and Soviet forces for winter camouflage during World War II. Because ordinary camouflage patterns were ineffective in the heavy snow conditions on the Eastern Front, aircraft, tanks, and other military vehicles were hastily brush-painted with plain white distemper during the winter of 1941–1942. Because distemper is water-soluble, photographs showing winter camouflage often show it badly eroded.

During the invasion of Normandy on June 6, 1944, all Allied aircraft participating in the invasion were marked on the wings and fuselage with "invasion stripes" painted with distemper so that naval or ground-based gunners would not misidentify them as German and fire on them, as had happened during the invasion of Sicily in 1943.

== Examples of paintings in distemper ==
- Fayum mummy portraits, from Late Antique Egypt (some in encaustic)
- Dirk Bouts Entombment, 1450s. National Gallery, London
- Many paintings by Mantegna
- The Raphael Cartoons, London
- Scottish Renaissance painted ceilings
- Édouard Vuillard Lunch at Vasouy, 1901, Tate Modern.
- Mark Tobey's White Journey, modern
- Le Grand Teddy by Édouard Vuillard
