= The Entombment (Bouts) =

Painting attributed to Dieric Bouts

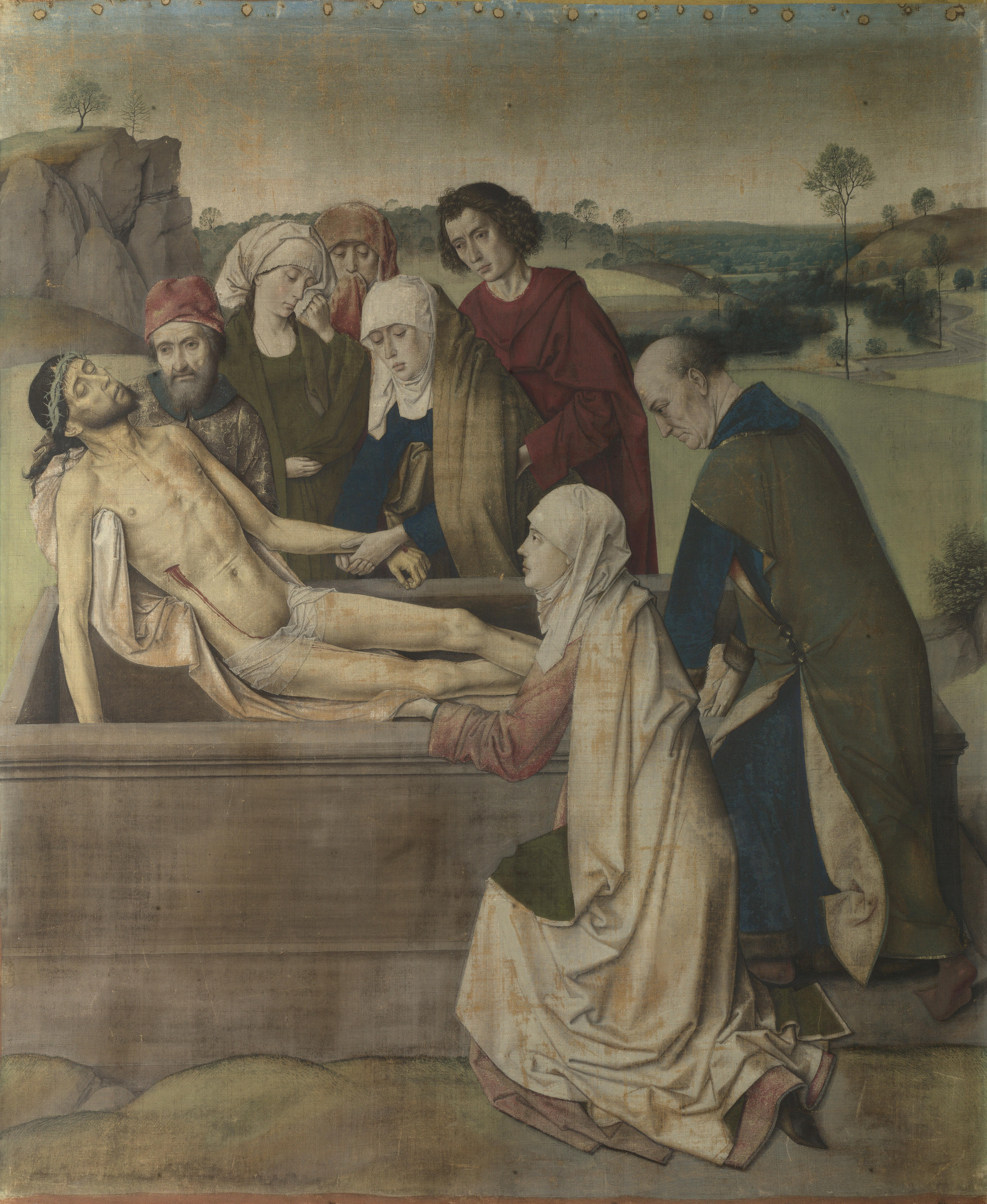
Dirk Bouts, The Entombment (Graflegging in Dutch), probably 1450s. Glue-size tempera on linen, 87.5 × 73.6 cm (34.4 × 29 in). National Gallery, London (NG 664)

The Entombment is a glue-size painting on linen (Note: Also known as Tiichlein or Tüchlein, a technique in which pigments were bound in glue and painted on a cloth treated with glue, it was a delicate and fragile technique. See Spronk, 8.) attributed to the Early Netherlandish painter Dieric Bouts. It shows a scene from the biblical entombment of Christ, and was probably completed between 1440 and 1455 as a wing panel for a large hinged polyptych. While the altarpiece remains lost as a complete set, it is thought to have contained a central crucifixion scene flanked by four wing panel works half its height – two on either side – depicting scenes from the life of Christ. The smaller flanking panels would have been paired in a format similar to Bouts's 1464–1468 Altarpiece of the Holy Sacrament. The larger work was probably commissioned for export to Italy, possibly to a Venetian patron whose identity is lost. The Entombment was first recorded in a mid-19th-century inventory in Milan, and has been in the National Gallery, London, since its purchase on the Gallery's behalf by Charles Lock Eastlake in 1861.

The painting is an austere but affecting portrayal of sorrow and grief. It shows four female and three male mourners grieving over the body of Christ. They are, from left to right, Nicodemus, Mary Salome, Mary of Clopas, Mary, the mother of Jesus, John the Evangelist, Mary Magdalene and Joseph of Arimathea.

It is one of the few surviving 15th-century paintings created using glue-size, an extremely fragile medium lacking durability. The Entombment is in relatively poor condition compared to panel paintings of similar age. Its colours are now far duller than when it was painted; they would, however, always have appeared as less intense and brilliant than those of comparable oil or tempera paintings on panel. The painting is covered by accumulated layers of grey dirt and cannot be cleaned without damaging the surface and removing large amounts of pigment as its glue-size medium is water-soluble. A strip at the top has been less affected than the rest because it was protected by a frame.

== Painting ==
=== Description ===
The Entombment shows Christ's body, wrapped in a white linen shroud, still wearing a crown of thorns, as he is lowered into a stone tomb. The body is attended by seven mourners dressed in contemporary 15th-century Burgundian Netherlands clothing. Among the mourners, the three female figures have downcast eyes while the two men look directly at Christ. These gazes are reversed in the pair of figures kneeling or crouching at his feet. The background contains a wide and delicate landscape with a winding pathway and a broad river before a more distant vista of trees and hills, devoid of people. Bouts is considered an innovative painter of landscapes, even in his portrait work where they are included as distant views seen through open windows. The vista in The Entombment is regarded as one of his finest, and is a typical one for Bouts, composed of distant brown and green hills against a blue sky. Wolfgang Schöne, however, wrote of "a motionless quiet under a grey sky," adding "Where else does a grey sky appear as a form of emotional expression in early Netherlandish painting?"

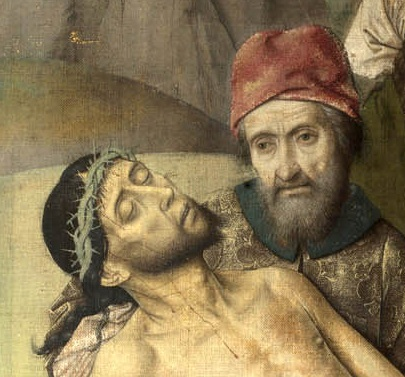
Detail showing Nicodemus supporting the lifeless body of Christ. Loss of pigment is visible in areas of Nicodemus' headdress.

The Pharisee Nicodemus supports Christ as he is lowered, and can be identified by his similarity to Simon the Pharisee in another canvas attributed to Bouts, Christ in the House of Simon. The Virgin wears a white headdress and a dark blue dress with a yellowish mantle, and holds Christ's arm just above his wrist as if afraid to let go of her dead son. She is supported by John the Evangelist, who wears a red robe. Dressed in green robes, Mary Salome stands to the Virgin's left, wiping tears from her face with the fold of her white headdress. Mary of Clopas is behind them, holding a red cloth over her mouth, while the Magdalen is in the foreground at Christ's feet, dressed in a heavily folded cloak. The man in the brown–green tabard at the feet of Christ is probably Joseph of Arimathea, who, according to the four canonical Gospels, brought Christ's body to Golgotha from Pontius Pilate.

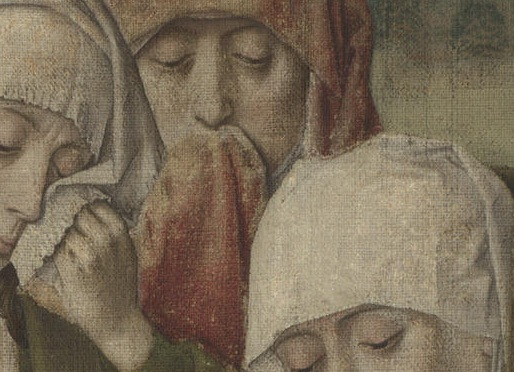
Detail showing the heads of Mary Salome, Mary of Clopas and The Virgin. The loss of paint (in the red cloth) and film of dirt (in the top right corner) are clearly visible.

The Entombment is painted on linen tightly woven, with 20 to 22 vertical threads per centimetre and between 19 and 22 horizontal threads per centimetre. (Note: It is difficult to determine the direction of the weaving because the selvage-edge is missing, making weft from warp indistinguishable. See Campbell 40.) The cloth is Z-spun (tightly spun) and tabby woven with flax possibly combined with cotton. The cloth support is lined, unusually, with similar (but more finely woven) mounted on a wooden stretcher. Before the paint was applied, the linen first had been mounted on a temporary stretcher and outlined with a brown border – now visible on the lower border – which was used as a guide to cut the picture down before framing. (Note: Guiding borders of this type are often found just under the frames of works from the period.) Glue-sizing consists of a distemper created by mixing pigments in water and then using a glue-base derived from boiled animal skin and other tissues as a binder. The pigments were applied to a linen cloth, treated with the same glue sizing, fixed in turn to its frame by glue. The paint saturated the cloth, often leaving an image on the reverse side, which was lined with an additional cloth.

Pigments bound in glue had an optical quality that rendered them opaque in appearance and unusually vivid. Unlike oil, which makes chalk appear translucent, chalk mixed in glue is rendered as stark white. Similarly, more expensive pigments assume brilliant opacity in a glue medium. The whites are chalk in areas mixed with lead white, especially in the Magdalen's mantle and veil, Christ's shroud and the Virgin's veil. The artist used four blue pigments, an unusual number for paintings of the period, with indigo predominating. As a plant-derived pigment, indigo it has a tendency to fade over time. Azurite and lead-white line the under-paint, while the landscape contains indigo mixed with lead-tin yellow. The sky and Nicodemus' collar are painted with lighter and less intense azurite, while the Virgin's dress is azurite mixed with ultramarine and smalt, a blue ground-glass pigment. The Entombment is one of the earliest European pictorial works of art in which the use of smalt could be ascertained and its presence proves that the pigment was not invented during the 16th century, as had previously been believed.

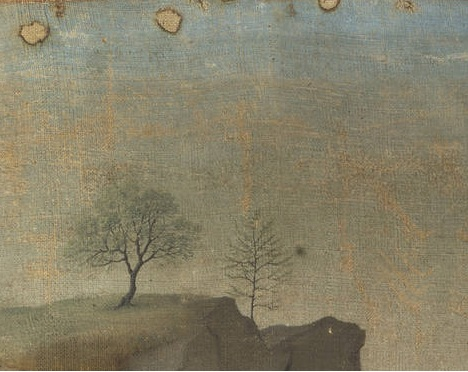
Detail showing distant hillside landscape in the left-hand corner. The nail holes are visible here in the skyline, and extend across the top of the painting. Note the layer of dirt across the midground and the black spot to the right of the second tree.

The greens are mostly verdigris, although those predominant in the landscape are mostly blends of blue and yellow pigments, and the green of the cloth worn by the figure of Mary Salome is malachite mixed with yellow lake. The browns are blends of reds and blacks. John's red robe is composed from cinnabar and vermilion made from rubia and insect dyes. Some of the reds are mixed with earth pigments not susceptible to the effects of light, and have thus survived close to their original appearance. Black pigments are generally bone blacks but in places derived from charcoal. The blacks are mixed with chalk in areas, producing a red to brownish 'earthy' appearance.

The cloth support is visible in areas where the paint was thinly applied. Rusty nail holes can be seen in the lower border and across the top of the picture in an area of sky that was initially covered by frame. They indicate that the woodworking was positioned much lower than Bouts had intended; generally works painted on commission were placed by professional joiners who worked independently of the painter. The low placement of the frame, however, protected the underlying colours over the centuries from light; they are preserved as first laid down. The panel was originally attached to its frame by pegs and nails; the nails would have been used to attach the linen to the underlying wooden frame.

=== Condition ===
Painting on linen cloth using glue size as a binder was at the time a relatively inexpensive alternative to working in oil paint, and a large number of works were produced in the 15th century. Glue size does not saturate the pigments as much as oil would, allowing them to show as matt and opaque, giving – especially with reds and blues – an intense appearance when applied to cloth. Cloth is fragile and perishes easily, and this work is one of the best preserved of the few surviving examples of the technique from the period; the majority extant today were executed on wood using oil or egg tempera. Curtains or glass were often used to protect glue-sized works.

The colours would have first appeared bright and crisp, but over five-and-a-half centuries the painting has acquired layers of grey dirt which darken the tone and render the colours faint and pallid. Normally these layers of dirt would be removed by restorers, but given the delicate and fragile nature of a work painted in a water-soluble medium, it would be impossible to do so without removing large amounts of pigment. Hence the colours as they appear today have faded from their original hues. The Virgin's mantle is now brown but would have been painted as blue. Joseph's tabard, once blue, now appears as green. The original indigos of the landscape are lost, while the azurite in Nicodemus's collar has darkened.

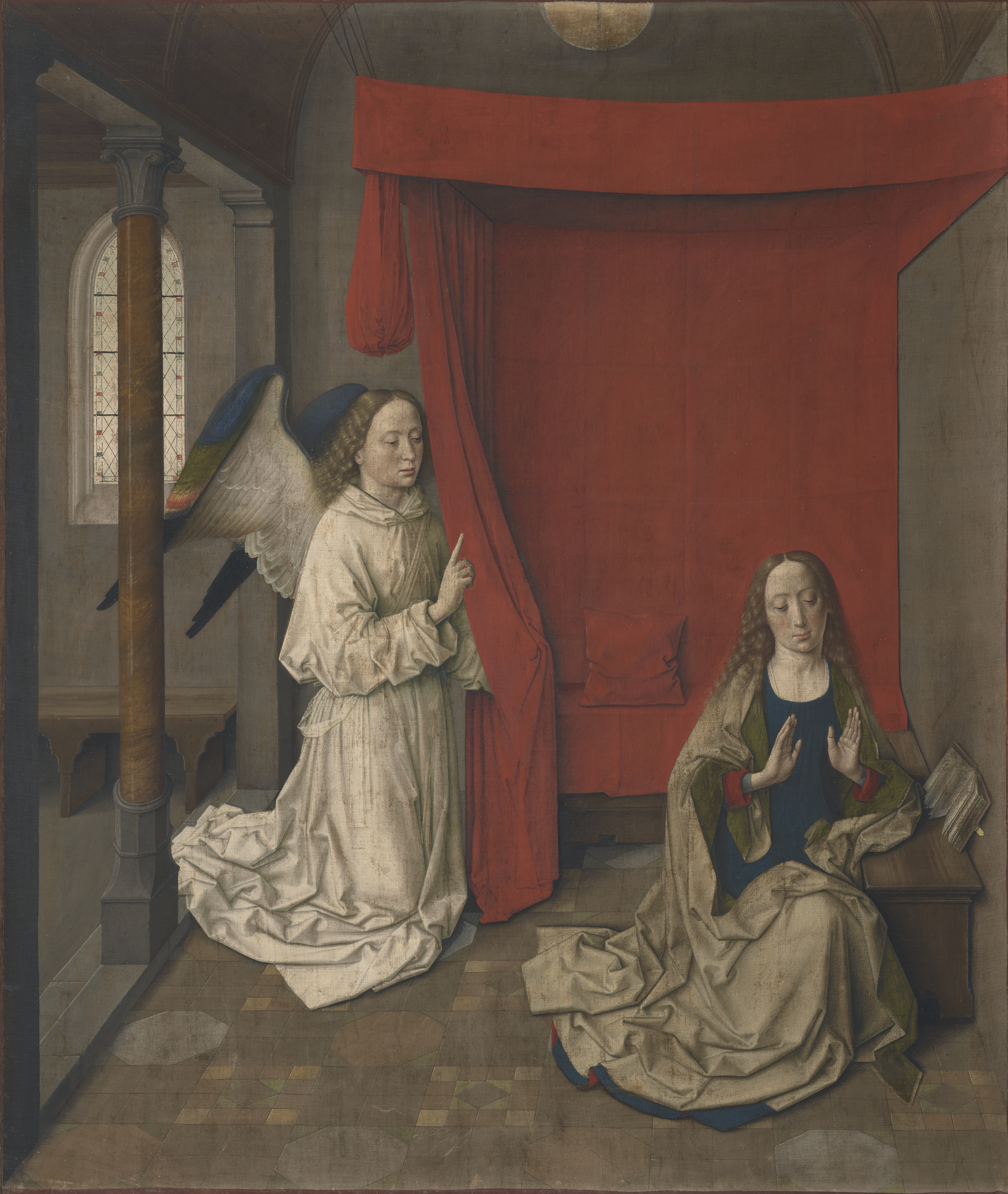
Annunciation, J. Paul Getty Museum, 90 × 74.5 cm. This tempera on linen may have been placed at the top left-hand corner of the polyptych.

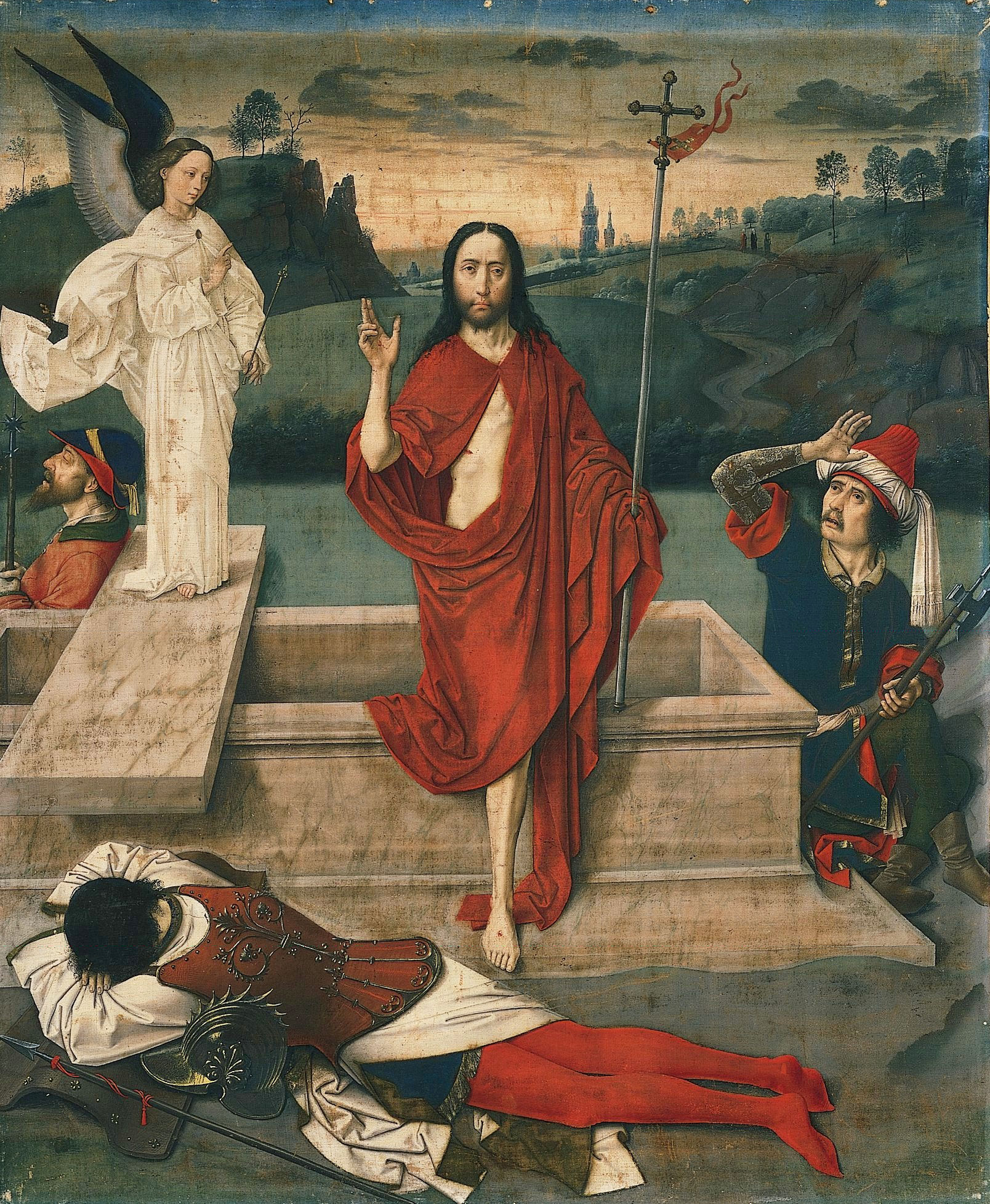
Resurrection, Norton Simon Museum, tempera on linen, 90 × 74.3 cm. It is believed to have been the lower image on the right wing.

It is possible to see the degree to which the technique allowed Bouts, in the words of art historian Susan Jones, to "[achieve such] sophistication ... to create both fine linear detail and subtle tonal transitions." Jones notes that the sky would have appeared with the same clear and pale blue that is still intact in a narrow strip along the top of the work, which has been protected from light and dirt by a frame. In its current condition the muted landscape appears to echo the sorrow of the mourning figures.

X-ray analysis shows that there were a few preparatory drawings made on the support with chalk before the paint was applied. This is left exposed in some areas, most noticeably in the Virgin's veil and mantle and in Christ's shroud. Infrared photography reveals little underdrawing but indicates that the canvas underwent several changes before completion: the figure of Mary Salome was repositioned slightly to the left, the sizes of Nicodemus' arm and shoulder were reduced, and the Magdalen's face was painted over the Virgin's mantle.

The cloth on which the work was painted had been lined with a more finely woven piece of linen and restretched, probably by the same person who stretched and lined the other works identified with the larger altarpiece. It was placed under glass, probably in the early 19th century and certainly before its acquisition by the National Gallery (Eastlake noted that it was protected by a layer of glass in 1858). The piece was evidently sent rolled and unframed to its patron. The brown border painted along the four sides indicates where the frame should be positioned when it is added to its final support. The row of rust-stained nail holes running along the top of the cloth is evidence that the frame was eventually positioned within the pictorial field, at a point far lower than Bouts had intended. This low framing protected a portion of the canvas from deterioration and allows us to see some of the colours as they would have originally appeared.

=== Polyptych ===
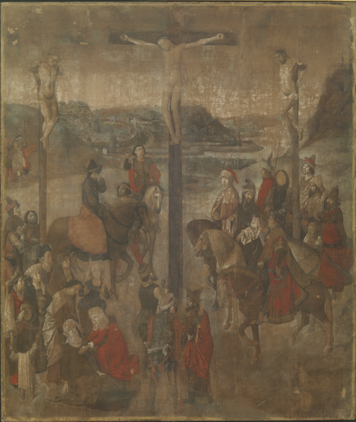
Bouts's Crucifixion (before 1464). In 1988 Robert Koch proposed that this ruined panel now in Brussels was the center piece of the lost Scenes from the Life of Christ polyptych.

Some scholars think the Entombment constituted one section of a larger altarpiece ensemble of several pictures – a polyptych. Charles Eastlake saw the isolated piece in 1858 and again in 1860 during visits to Milan to purchase examples of Northern Renaissance art on behalf of the National Gallery. He also viewed three companion pieces but was told they were not on sale. His notes describe each of these other works, which he titled: Annunciation (now in the J. Paul Getty Museum), Adoration of the Kings (now in a private collection in Germany) and Presentation (or Resurrection; now in the Norton Simon Museum, Pasadena, California). All were shown at a 1872 exhibition at the Brera Museum in Milan, and all were loaned by descendants of Diego Guicciardi. These three works are the same size as The Entombment, have similar colouring and pigmentation and are painted on similar linen cloth using the same glue-size technique, but are not as well preserved. It is probable that all were re-lined and stretched at the same time by the same restorer, indicating that they were kept together until shortly before The Entombment was acquired by the National Gallery.

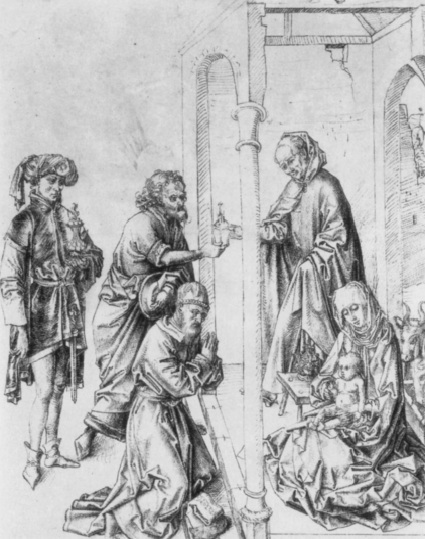
Pen and ink copy of the Adoration of the Magi (or "Kings") by an unknown artist. Uffizi, Florence.

Art historian Robert Koch remarked in 1988 on the similarity of provenance, material, technique, tone and colour of the four works described by Eastlake. He proposed that they were intended as wings of a five-part polyptych altarpiece. Based on the format of Bouts's 1464–1468 Altarpiece of the Holy Sacrament, whose four wing panels are the same length as The Entombment, he suggested the altarpiece would have comprised a large central panel with four works half its length and width positioned two at either side. His speculative reconstruction places The Entombment on the upper right-hand wing, above the Adoration.

The large centre canvas has not been positively identified. Both Koch and Campbell believe that a damaged Crucifixion, now in the Royal Museums of Fine Arts of Belgium, Brussels, was probably the centrepiece. Its size (181 × 153.5 cm) is exactly double that of the four wing panels. Campbell believes that the altarpiece was painted on commission for export, most likely to Venice. The altarpiece was probably broken up as large religious works had fallen out of fashion by the 17th century, and would have had more value as single panels.

The compilers of the 2006 catalogue raisonné review the proposal by Bomfort, Roy and Smith, taken up by Koch, Hans van Miegroet and Campbell, that the Resurrection panel constituted the center of a single altarpiece that would have included the London Entombment. They add: "This reconstruction in turn has generated various theories, none of which has so far found unanimous acceptance." Périer-D'Ieteren writes that she and her co-editors accept that the Annunciation, Entombment and Resurrection are of a piece, stemming from the Guicciardi Collection – but they find the inclusion of the Crucifixion a problematic reconstruction. They conclude that "no definitive conclusion seems possible.... Too many questions remain unanswered for the debate to be considered closed."

== Provenance and attribution ==
Bouts did not inscribe any of his paintings, which makes attribution and dating difficult. His developing skill with perspective and unified vanishing points are used by art historians to date his works from the period. Although its colourisation is among the best of his work, the perspective is clumsy in areas, suggesting the painting can be assumed to date from no later than 1460. Bouts often quoted visual passages from artists and paintings that influenced his work, so the influences are well established and datable. Along with the work's companion Resurrection, the British art historian Martin Davies argued the work shows influences from Rogier van der Weyden's Descent from the Cross (c. 1435) and the Miraflores Altarpiece (1440s), which would place the Entombment after 1440. (Note: Campbell sees the influence of the Miraflores Altarpiece in the representation of Christ's dead body, while British art historian Martin Davies speculated that a relief in the architecture of van der Weyden's center panel may have informed the positioning of Bouts's mourners. See Campbell 44.) Robert Koch dates it to between 1450 and 1455.

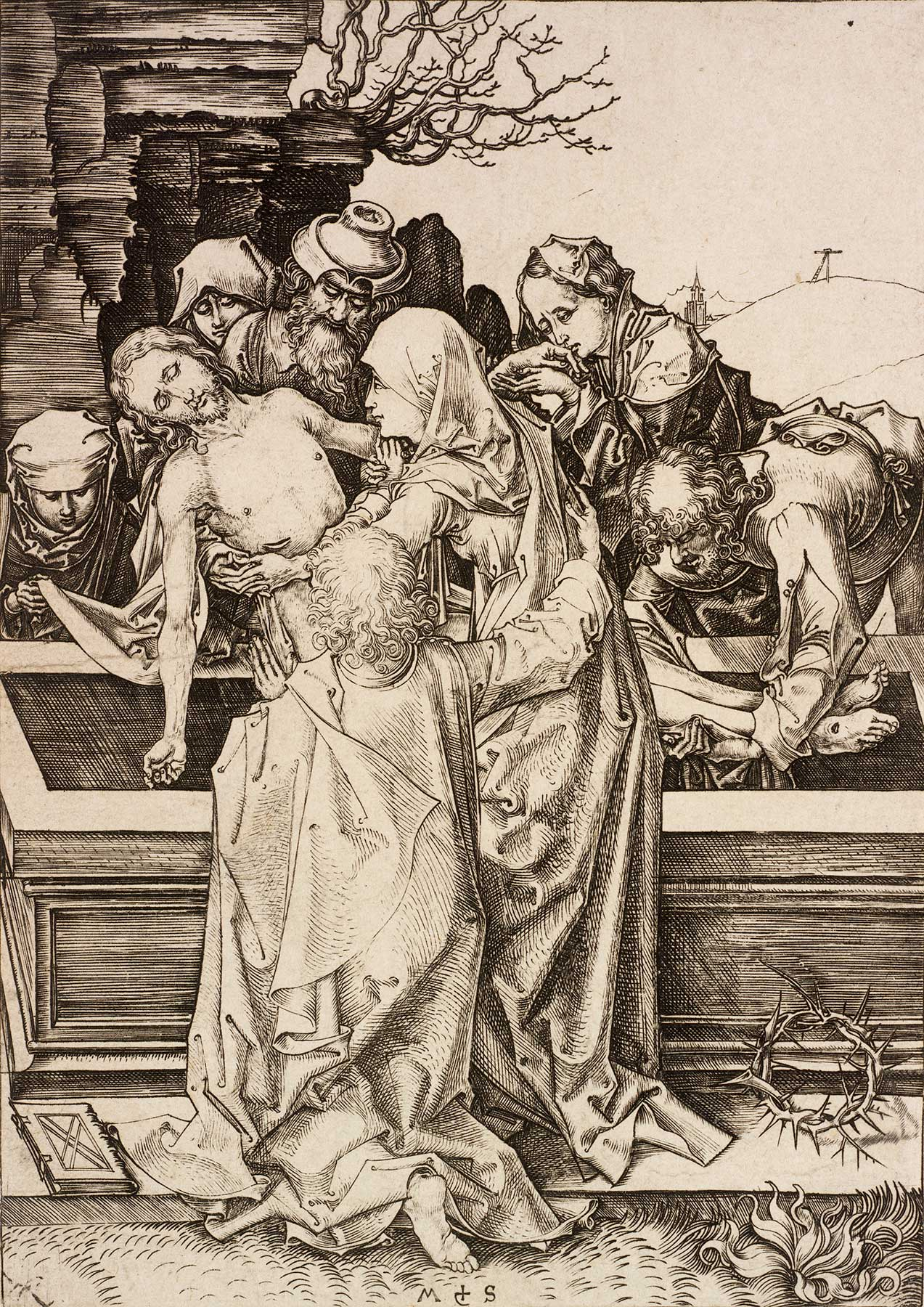
The Entombment, engraving by Martin Schongauer, c. 1480. Museum of Art, Rhode Island School of Design.

During a period of aggressive acquisition intended to establish the international prestige of Britain's collection, the work was acquired for the National Gallery in 1860 in Milan from the Guicciardi family by Charles Lock Eastlake for just over £120, along with a number of other Netherlandish works. Eastlake's notes mention that the works were "originally in the possession of the Foscari family". The Foscaris were a wealthy Venetian family which included Francesco Foscari who had served as Doge of Venice at the time the work was painted. The dramatic story of him and his son is told in Lord Byron's play The Two Foscari, and in Verdi's opera I due Foscari. There is no documentary evidence to substantiate the claim that the painting came from the Foscari collection, and some art historians believe that representatives of the Guicciardis invented this provenance to impress Eastlake. Lorne Campbell considers the provenance "probable", noting that a descendant, Ferigo Foscari (1732–1811), an ambassador to the Russian court at Saint Petersburg, squandered his fortune and may have been forced into selling pictures belonging to the family. Campbell speculates that the painting was produced on commission for export to Venice, noting that unrolled linen would have been easier to transport than canvas, and that the row of holes just below the upper border could be explained if it had been stretched, mounted and framed by someone other than Bouts or a member of his workshop.

The companion pieces in the Guicciardi collection (Annunciation, Adoration of the Kings, and Resurrection) were similar works in glue-size, though of lesser quality: Eastlake's notebooks mention them as "not so good (not so well preserved)". Their style and size are similar to The Entombment, suggesting that they were probably pieces that would have formed part of the larger polyptych. The Entombment had been attributed to Lucas van Leyden at the time, though Eastlake thought that, given its emotional power, it might be a van der Weyden. (Note: Van Leyden and van der Weyden were often mistaken for each other due to the similarity of their surnames, both of which have many different spellings in the historical and art historical records.) Bouts studied under van der Weyden, and was strongly influenced by his master's work. Davies proposed in 1953 that the figuration and pose in The Entombment may have been informed by a small grisaille relief in the arch of the central panel of van der Weyden's Miraflores Altarpiece.

The painting arrived in London from Milan in 1861, but was not attributed to Bouts until 1911. Two known copies exist: an unsophisticated panel sold in Munich to a private collector in 1934, and an oak panel attributed to a follower, now in Kreuzlingen, Switzerland.

The example and renown of 15th-century Netherlandish painting spread across Europe by late in the century, and many copies or designs based on the work of the Netherlandish masters were produced. Likely following the compositional example of Rogier van der Weyden, the London canvas is the only surviving example of a work on the subject by Bouts. The influence of Bouts's Entombment can be seen, in turn, in the German artist Martin Schongauer's c. 1480 engraving of the same name, which shares compositional similarity and echoes Bouts's use of painted emotive gesture, posture, and expression.
