= Christ Carrying the Cross (disambiguation) =

Christ Carrying the Cross refers to Jesus's journey to his crucifixion.

Christ Carrying the Cross may also refer to:

== Paintings ==
- Christ Carrying the Cross (Bosch, Ghent), early 16th century, attributed to a follower of Hieronymus Bosch, now in the Museum of Fine Arts
- Christ Carrying the Cross (Bosch, Madrid), 1505–07, by Hieronymus Bosch, now in the Royal Palace of Madrid
- Christ Carrying the Cross (Bosch, Vienna), 1480s, by Hieronymus Bosch, now at the Kunsthistorisches Museum
- Christ Carrying the Cross (El Greco, Barcelona), 1590–1595, now in the Museu Nacional d'Art de Catalunya
- Christ Carrying the Cross (El Greco, Madrid), 1597–1600, now in the Museo del Prado
- Christ Carrying the Cross (El Greco, New York), 1580, now in the Metropolitan Museum of Art
- Christ Carrying the Cross (Lotto), 1526, by Lorenzo Lotto, now in the Louvre, Paris
- Christ Carrying the Cross (Titian), 1505, attributed to Titian or Giorgione, now in the Scuola Grande di San Rocco, Venice

== Sculpture ==
- Christ Carrying the Cross (Richier), by Ligier Richier

== See also ==
- Christ Falling on the Way to Calvary, a c.1514–16 painting by Raphael, now in the Museo del Prado, Madrid
- Risen Christ (Michelangelo, Santa Maria sopra Minerva) or Christ Carrying the Cross, a 1521 marble sculpture by Michelangelo
- The Procession to Calvary (Bruegel), a 1564 painting by Pieter Bruegel the Elder, now in the Kunsthistorisches Museum, Vienna
