= List of paintings by Hieronymus Bosch =

Overview of paintings made by Hieronymus Bosch

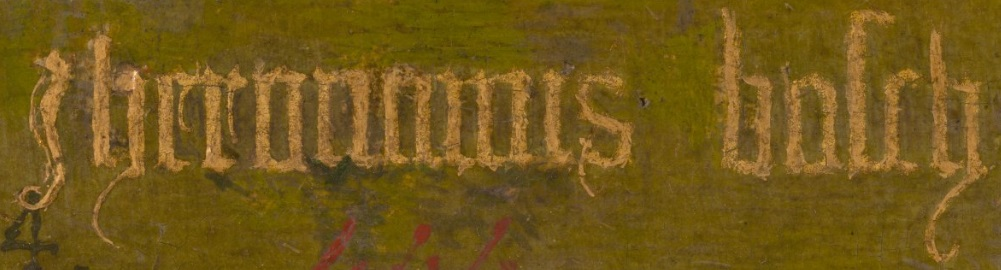
Bosch's signature from the triptych Adoration of the Magi. Only a few of the surviving paintings by him are signed.

Paintings by Hieronymus Bosch, as well as paintings attributed to him or his school, have been compiled by various organizations. An investigation undertaken by The Bosch Research and Conservation Project of a multitude of Bosch's paintings included dendrochronological research and made an approximate dating of the paintings possible. The findings of this investigation were published in a book in 2016. The book describes the other findings of the investigation as well, such as painting technique, layer structure and pigment analyses.

Bosch's works are generally organized into three periods of his life dealing with the early works (c. 1470–1485), the middle period (c. 1485–1500), and the late period (c. 1500 until his death). According to Stefan Fischer, thirteen of Bosch's surviving paintings were completed in the late period, with seven surviving paintings attributed to his middle period. Bosch's early period is studied in terms of his workshop activity and possibly some of his drawings. There are no surviving paintings attributed before 1485.

== Triptychs ==
Image	Title	Year	Technique	Dimensions	Location	Details
Adoration of the Magi	Adoration of the Magi	c. 1491–1498	Oil on wood	138 × 144 cm	Museo del Prado, Madrid, Spain	
Outside of Adoration of the Magi	Saint Gregory's Mass	c. 1491–1498	Oil on wood	138 × 144 cm	Museo del Prado, Madrid, Spain	The outer panels of 'Adoration of the Magi' form a single image, Saint Gregory's Mass, rendered in grisaille.
The Garden of Earthly Delights	The Garden of Earthly Delights	c. 1495–1505	Oil on wood	220 × 389 cm	Museo del Prado, Madrid, Spain	
Outside panels of The Garden of Earthly Delights	The Creation of the World	c. 1495–1505	Oil on wood	220 × 389 cm	Museo del Prado, Madrid, Spain	The outer panels of the Garden of Earthly Delights form a single image, The Creation of the World, rendered in grisaille
Hermit Saints Triptych	Hermit Saints Triptych	c. 1495–1505	Oil on wood	86 × 100 cm	Gallerie dell'Accademia, Venice	
The Last Judgment	The Last Judgment	c. 1495–1505	Oil on wood	99.5 × 117.5 cm	Groeningemuseum, Bruges, Belgium	Attributed to Bosch and/or his workshop. The outer panels form a single image, Christ Crowned with Thorns.
Outside panels of The Last Judgment	Outside panels of "The Last Judgment"	c. 1495–1505	Oil on wood	99.5 × 117.5 cm	Groeningemuseum, Bruges, Belgium	The outer panels form a single image, Christ Crowned with Thorns
The Martyrdom of St. Julia	The Martyrdom of St. Julia	c. 1495–1505	Oil on wood	104 × 119 cm	Gallerie dell'Accademia, Venice, Italy	
X-rays of The Martyrdom of St. Julia	The Martyrdom of St. Julia	c. 1495–1505	Oil on wood	104 × 119 cm	Gallerie dell'Accademia, Venice, Italy	X-rays of The Martyrdom of St. Julia showing the painting originally depicted donors on the left and right
The Temptation of St. Anthony	The Temptation of St. Anthony (left, central and right panels)	c. 1500–1510	Oil on wood	131.5 × 225 cm	Museu Nacional de Arte Antiga, Lisbon, Portugal	
Outside panels of The Temptation of St. Anthony	The Temptation of St. Anthony (Reverse side of the outer panels)	c. 1500–1510	Oil on wood	131.5 × 225 cm	Museu Nacional de Arte Antiga, Lisbon, Portugal	The outer panels show two images: The Arrest of Christ and Christ Bearing the Cross, both rendered in grisaille.
The Last Judgment	The Last Judgment	c. 1500–1505	Oil on wood	163.7 × 127 cm (central panel) 167.7 × 60 cm (left wing) 167 × 60 cm (right wing)	Academy of Fine Arts Vienna, Austria	The outer panels show two images: Saint James the Greater and Saint Bavo, both rendered in grisaille.
	Outside panels of The Last Judgment	c. 1500–1505	Oil on wood	167.7 × 60 cm (left wing) 167 × 60 cm (right wing)	Academy of Fine Arts, Vienna, Austria	The outer panels show two images: Saint James the Greater and Saint Bavo, both rendered in grisaille.
The Haywain (Prado version)	The Haywain	1510–1516	Oil on wood	147 × 232 cm (Escorial version) 135 x 190 cm (Prado version)	El Escorial, Spain (version 1) Museo del Prado, Madrid, Spain (version 2)	The outer panels form a single image, usually referred to as The Path of Life.
	Outside panels of "The Haywain Triptych"	1510–1516	Oil on wood	135 x 190 cm (Prado version)	Museo del Prado, Madrid, Spain (version 2)	The outer panels form a single image, usually referred to as The Path of Life aka The Pedlar.
Passion Triptych	Passion Triptych	c. 1530	Oil on panel	163 × 382 cm	Museu de Belles Arts de València, Valencia, Spain	Commissioned by Mencía de Mendoza (1508–1554) for her burial chapel (the Chapel of the Epiphany) in the convent of Santo Domingo, Valencia. Probably not a work by Bosch, but by a Flemish follower.

== Diptychs and polyptychs ==
Image	Title	Year	Technique	Dimensions	Location	Details
The Fall of the Rebel Angels (back: Mankind Beset by Devils) The Fall of the Rebel Angels (front) Noah's Ark on Mount Ararat (front) Noah's Ark on Mount Ararat (back: Mankind Beset by Devils)	Diptych (Hell and the Flood): Mankind Beset by Devils (Panel at left Outside of The Fall of the Rebel Angels); The Fall of the Rebel Angels; Noah's Ark on Mount Ararat; Mankind Beset by Devils (Panel at right outside of Noah's Ark on Mount Ararat)	c. 1514	Oil on wood	69.5 × 35 cm (each panel) 34.5 cm (diameter of paintings on the reverse sides)	Museum Boijmans Van Beuningen, Rotterdam, Netherlands	
	Polyptych (Visions of the Hereafter): Fall of the Damned; Hell; Terrestrial Paradise; Ascent of the Blessed	c. 1505–15	Oil on wood	86.5 × 39.5 cm (each)	Gallerie dell'Accademia, Venice, Italy	Also known as Cardinal Grimani's Altarpiece. Probably part of a larger altarpiece (four more paintings), now considered lost.

== Single panels and fragments of lost altarpieces ==
=== The life of Christ ===
Image	Title	Year	Technique	Dimensions	Location	Details
Adoration of the Child	Adoration of the Child	c. 1560	Oil on wood	66 × 43 cm	Wallraf-Richartz Museum, Cologne, Germany	Bosch's authorship is disputed; possibly a copy after a lost Bosch original. Another, wider version of the same painting is kept in Noordbrabants Museum, 's-Hertogenbosch (on loan from the Rijksmuseum, Amsterdam), and yet another is in the Royal Museums of Fine Arts of Belgium in Brussels.
	Adoration of the Child	c. 1568	Oil on wood		Noordbrabants Museum, 's-Hertogenbosch (on loan from the Rijksmuseum, Amsterdam),	Wider copy
	Adoration of the Magi	c. 1470–1480	Oil on wood	71.1 × 56.5 cm	Metropolitan Museum of Art, New York, USA	Described by Friedländer as ‘an especially early work by the master’; later deemed a 16th-century pastiche; more recently thought to be a work dating back to the 1470s from Bosch's immediate circle
Philadelphia Adoration of the Magi	Adoration of the Magi	c. 1499	Oil on wood	94 × 74 cm	Philadelphia Museum of Art, Philadelphia, USA	Attributed to Bosch's workshop
	Adoration of the Magi	c. 1515	Oil on panel	100.5 x 73.5 cm	National Trust, Petworth House, United Kingdom	Attributed to Bosch, this panel is a high quality variant of the central panel of the Museo del Prado version (also visible under Triptychs).
Crucifixion With a Donor	Crucifixion with a Donor	c. 1480–1485	Oil on wood	74.7 × 61 cm	Royal Museums of Fine Arts of Belgium, Brussels, Belgium	
	Christ Carrying the Cross (Vienna) [top panel] Christ Child with a Walking Frame(Vienna) [bottom panel]	c. 1490–1510	Oil on wood	57 × 32 cm	Kunsthistorisches Museum, Vienna, Austria	The reverse side of the panel has another painting on it, Christ Child with a Walking Frame (diameter 28 cm).
Christ Carrying the Cross	Christ Carrying the Cross (Ghent)	c. 1530–1540	Oil on wood	74 × 81 cm	Museum of Fine Arts, Ghent, Belgium	Bosch's authorship is disputed.
Christ Carrying the Cross	Christ Carrying the Cross (Madrid)	c. 1495–1505	Oil on wood	150 × 94 cm	Palacio Real, Madrid, Spain	
Christ Crowned with Thorns	Christ Crowned with Thorns (London)	c. 1490–1500	Oil on wood	73 × 59 cm	National Gallery, London, UK	
Christ Crowned with Thorns	Christ Crowned with Thorns (Escorial)	c. 1530–1540	Oil on wood	165 × 195 cm	El Escorial, Spain	Painted neither by Bosch nor his workshop.
Ecce Homo	Ecce Homo (Philadelphia)	c. 1510	Oil on wood	52 × 54 cm	Philadelphia Museum of Art, Philadelphia, USA	Previously attributed to Bosch; dendrochronological analysis proved it to be a late 16th-century work by a follower
Ecce Homo	Ecce Homo (Frankfurt)	c. 1475–1485	Oil on wood	71 × 61 cm	Städel Museum, Frankfurt, Germany	
The Marriage Feast at Cana	The Marriage Feast at Cana	c. 1500	Oil on wood	93 × 72 cm	Museum Boijmans Van Beuningen, Rotterdam, Netherlands	Several versions of this painting exist. However, none of these date from Bosch's lifetime.
Descent of Christ into Limbo	Descent of Christ into Limbo	c. 1501-1525	Oil on panel	Height: 100 cm (39.3 in); Width: 74 cm (29.1 in)	Private collection	
Christ Descent into Hell	Christ descent into Hell	c. 1550	Oil on panel	13.7 x 10.2 cm	National Museum in Warsaw	Bosch's authorship is disputed

=== Saints ===
Image	Title	Year	Technique	Dimensions	Location	Details
St. John the Baptist in the Wilderness	St. Jerome at Prayer	c. 1485–1495	Oil on wood	77 × 59 cm	Museum of Fine Arts, Ghent, Belgium	
St. Christopher Carrying the Christ Child	St. Christopher Carrying the Christ Child	c. 1490–1500	Oil on wood	113 × 71.5 cm	Museum Boijmans Van Beuningen, Rotterdam, Netherlands	
St. John the Baptist in the Wilderness	St. John the Baptist in the Wilderness	c. 1490–1495	Oil on wood	48.5 × 40 cm	Museo Lázaro Galdiano, Madrid, Spain	
St. John the Evangelist on Patmos	St. John the Evangelist on Patmos	c. 1490–1495	Oil on wood	63 × 43.3 cm	Gemäldegalerie, Berlin, Germany	The reverse side of the panel has a round double painting (diameter 39 cm) on it: Scenes from the Passion of Christ (outer circle) and The Pelican with Her Young (inner circle).
	Outside panel of St. John the Evangelist on Patmos	c. 1490–1495	Oil on wood	diameter 39 cm.	Gemäldegalerie, Berlin, Germany	The reverse side of the panel has a round double painting (diameter 39 cm) on it: Scenes from the Passion of Christ (outer circle) and The Pelican with Her Young (inner circle).
The Temptation of St. Anthony	The Temptation of St. Anthony	c. 1500–1510	Oil on wood	38.6 x 25.1 cm	Nelson-Atkins Museum of Art, Kansas City, MO, USA	There was a dispute as to whether this work was a Bosch autograph or a piece by the workshop until the Bosch Research and Conservation Project concluded it to be autograph based on evidence present in the underdrawing.
The Temptation of St. Anthony	The Temptation of St. Anthony	c. 1530–1540	Oil on wood	70 × 51 cm	Museo del Prado, Madrid, Spain	Bosch's authorship is disputed.

=== Other works ===
Image	Title	Year	Technique	Dimensions	Location	Details
	Terrestrial Paradise [left panel] Death of the Reprobate [Right panel]	c. 1500 (1490–1510)	Oil on wood	Left panel: 34.5 cm (13.5 in) x 21 cm (8.2 in). Right panel: 34.6 × 21.2 cm	Private collection, New York, USA	"Paradise" and "Reprobate" are the left and right wings of a missing Last Judgement triptych
Ship of Fools	Ship of Fools	c. 1500–1510	Oil on wood	58 × 33 cm	Louvre, Paris, France	Fragment of a lost triptych which also included Allegory of Gluttony and Lust (which is the lower part of the Ship of Fools wing) and Death and the Miser (the other outer wing).
Allegory of Gluttony and Lust	Allegory of Gluttony and Lust	c. 1500–1510	Oil on wood	35.8 × 32 cm	Yale University Art Gallery, New Haven, USA	Fragment of a lost triptych which also included Ship of Fools (the Allegory would be the lower part of that outer wing) and Death and the Miser (the other outer wing).
Death and the Miser	Death and the Miser	c. 1500–1510	Oil on wood	92.6 × 30.8 cm	National Gallery of Art, Washington, D.C., USA	Outer wing of a lost triptych. The other outer wing comprised Ship of Fools (top) and Allegory of Gluttony and Lust (bottom).
	The Ship of Fools/Death and the Miser triptych	c. 1500–1515	Oil on wood			A reconstruction of the left and right wings of the triptych: at upper left The Ship of Fools; at lower left: Allegory of Gluttony and Lust. Panel at right is Death and the Miser. At bottom the outer panel The Wayfarer.
The Wayfarer	The Wayfarer	c. 1500–1510	Oil on wood	71.5 cm (diameter)	Museum Boijmans Van Beuningen, Rotterdam, Netherlands	This is the outer panel of a lost triptych, possibly from the Ship of Fools triptych
Cutting the Stone	Cutting the Stone	c. 1500–1520	Oil on wood	48 × 35 cm	Museo del Prado, Madrid, Spain	Also known as The Cure of Folly.
The Seven Deadly Sins and the Four Last Things	The Seven Deadly Sins and the Four Last Things	c. 1510–1520	Oil on wood	120 × 150 cm	Museo del Prado, Madrid, Spain	Bosch's authorship is disputed.
The Last Judgment (fragment)	The Last Judgment (fragment)	c. 1530–1540	Oil on wood	60 × 114 cm	Alte Pinakothek, Munich, Germany	Fragment of a lost triptych. Bosch's authorship is disputed.
The Conjurer	The Conjurer	c. 1530–1540	Oil on wood	53 × 65 cm	Musée Municipal, Saint-Germain-en-Laye, France	Bosch's authorship is disputed.
Head of a Halberdier	Head of a Halberdier	c. 1490–1500	Oil on wood	28 × 20 cm	Museo del Prado, Madrid, Spain	Fragment of a Christ Crowned with Thorns by a follower of Bosch.
Head of a Woman	Head of a Woman	c. 1500	Oil on wood	13 × 5 cm	Museum Boijmans Van Beuningen, Rotterdam, Netherlands	Fragment. Bosch's authorship is disputed.

== See also ==
- Hieronymus Bosch drawings
