= The Owls' Nest =

Drawing by Hieronymus Bosch

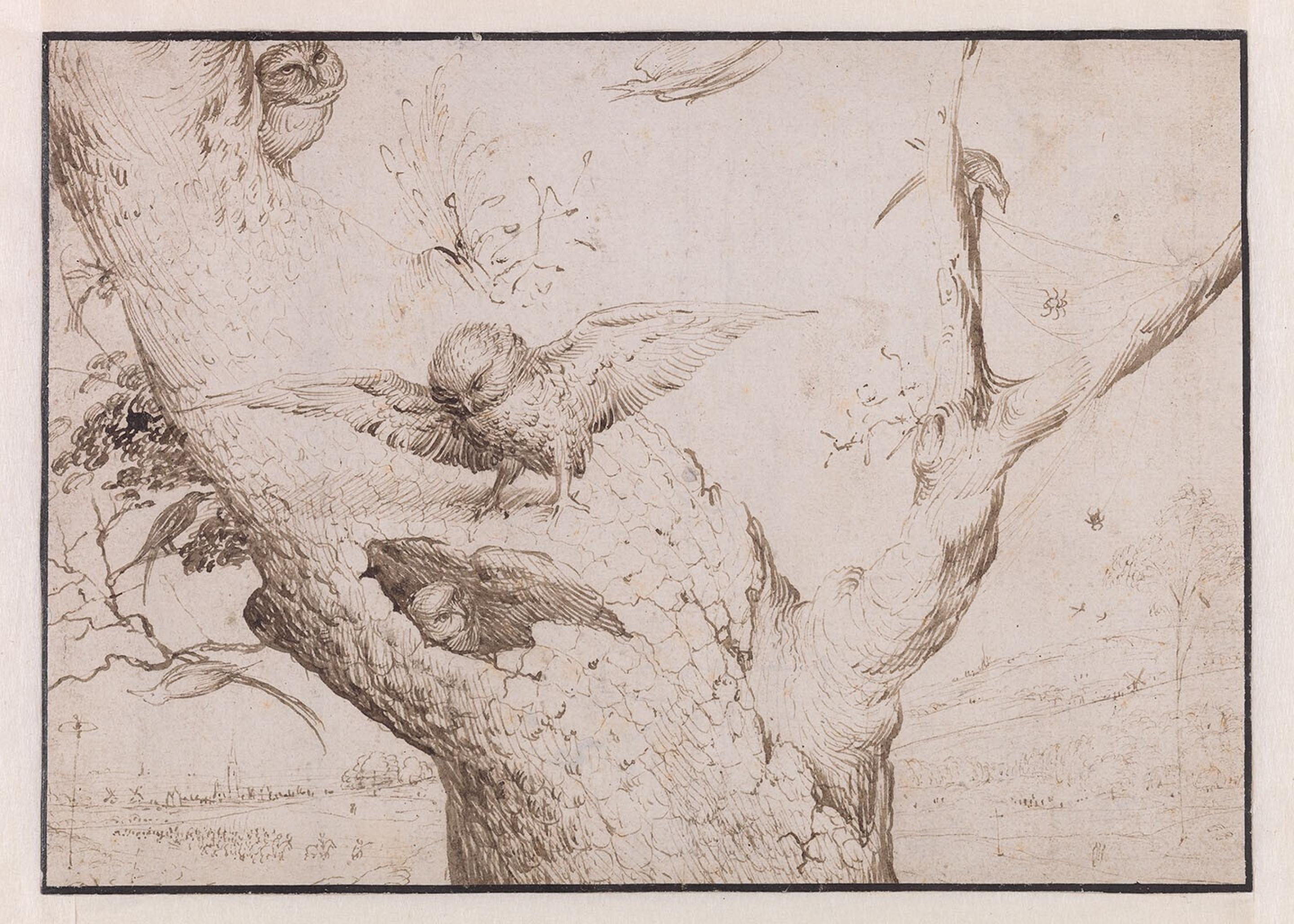
The Owls' Nest, by Hieronymus Bosch

The Owls' Nest is a drawing by Hieronymus Bosch, now in the Museum Boijmans Van Beuningen.

== See also ==
- Hieronymus Bosch drawings
- List of drawings by Hieronymus Bosch
- List of paintings by Hieronymus Bosch

== Bibliography ==
- Bruyn, Eric de (2001) De vergeten beeldentaal van Jheronimus Bosch, 's-Hertogenbosch: Heinen, ISBN 90-70706-35-0.
