= Hell (Bosch) =

Painting by Hieronymus Bosch

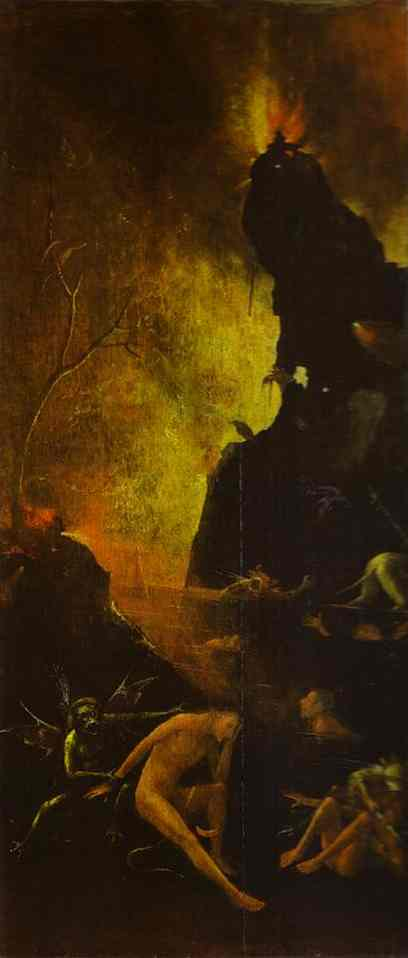
- Artist: Hieronymus Bosch
- Year: after 1490
- Location: Gallerie dell'Accademia; Venice

Hell is an oil-on-panel painting executed after 1490 by the Dutch artist Hieronymus Bosch. It is currently in the Gallerie dell'Accademia in Venice, Italy.

This painting is part of a series of four. The others are Ascent of the Blessed, Terrestrial Paradise and Fall of the Damned into Hell. In this panel it shows the punishment of the wicked in Hell with diverse kinds of torture laid out by demons.

== See also ==
- List of paintings by Hieronymus Bosch
