= Ascent of the Blessed =

Painting by Hieronymus Bosch

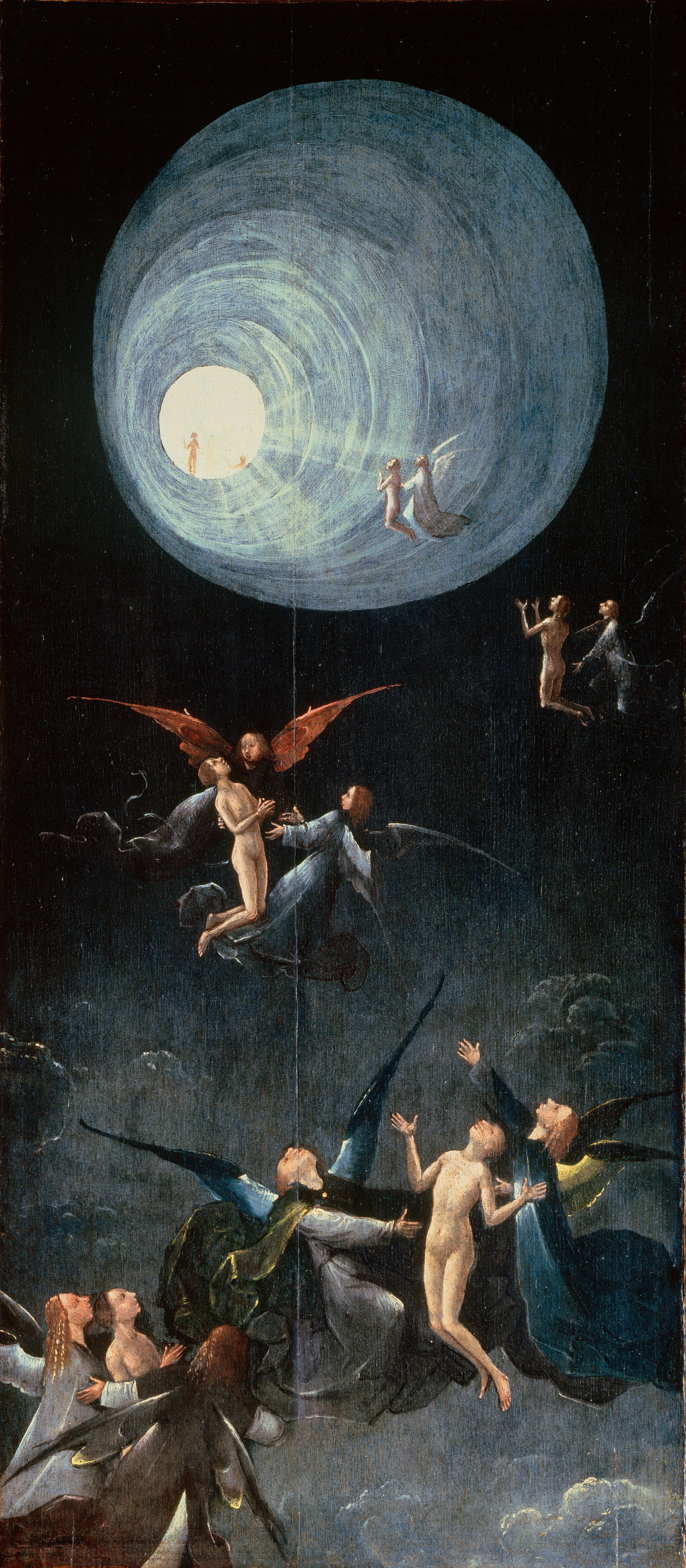
- Artist: Hieronymus Bosch
- Year: c. 1505-1515
- Medium: Oil on panel
- Dimensions: 86.5 cm × 39.5 cm (34.1 in × 15.6 in)
- Location: Gallerie dell'Accademia, Venice

Ascent of the Blessed is a Hieronymus Bosch painting made between 1505 and 1515. It depicts angels helping human souls towards heaven. The attribution to Bosch is not universally accepted.

It is located in the Gallerie dell'Accademia in Venice, Italy. This painting is part of a polyptych of four panels entitled Visions of the Hereafter. The others are Terrestrial Paradise, Fall of the Damned into Hell and Hell.

== Arrangement of the Polyptych ==
When hung in Venice in 2011, the order of the panels was Fall of the Damned into Hell, Hell, space, Terrestrial Paradise, and Ascent of the Blessed. The Terrestrial Paradise was placed on the left because it resembles other Eden panels by Bosch, especially with its landscape, fountain, and following biblical convention. Another possible arrangement is Ascent, Paradise, Hell and the Fall which takes inspiration from Matthew 25: 32–3 in the Bible. The Bosch scholar, Ludwig von Baldass, does not mention any other possible arrangements and feels that “the wings are divided into two portions, one above the other, representing on the left the figures of the saved being escorted by angels into Paradise and on the right the fall of the damned into Hell. Some scholars believe that Visions of the Hereafter are the wings to a missing middle panel which would presumably be the Last Judgement.

== See also ==
- List of paintings by Hieronymus Bosch
