= Flood Panels =

Painting attributed to Hiernymus Bosch

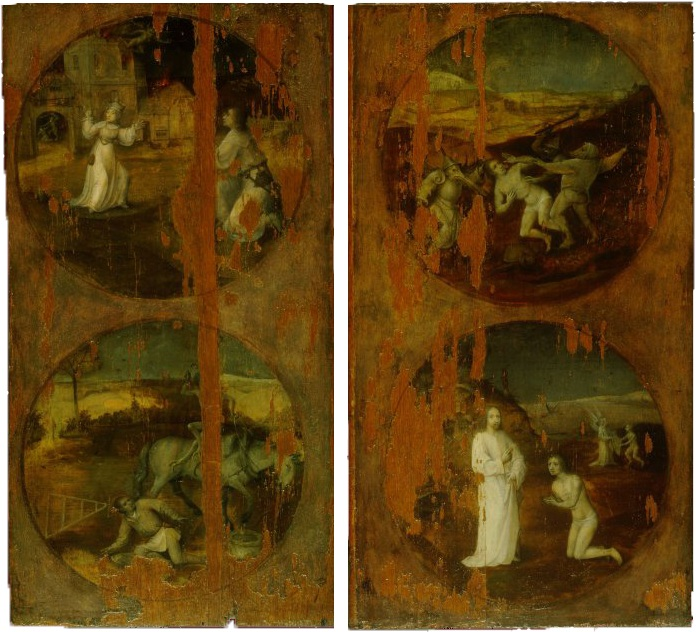
Verso

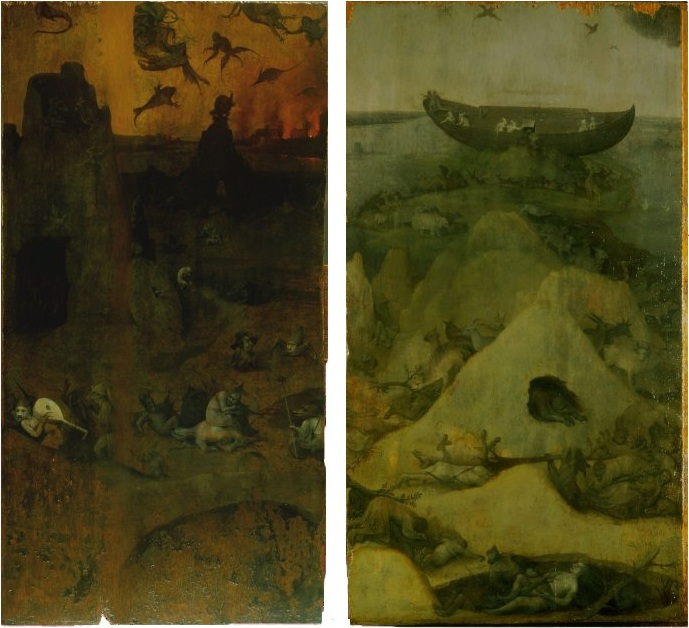
Recto

The Flood Panels are two double-sided painted panels attributed to the Early Netherlandish artist Hieronymus Bosch, dating to c. 1514 and now in the Museum Boijmans Van Beuningen in Rotterdam.

== See also ==
- List of paintings by Hieronymus Bosch

== Bibliography ==
- Franca Varallo, Bosch, Skira, Milano 2004.
