= Crucifixion with a Donor =

Painting by Hieronymus Bosch

Crucifixion With a Donor
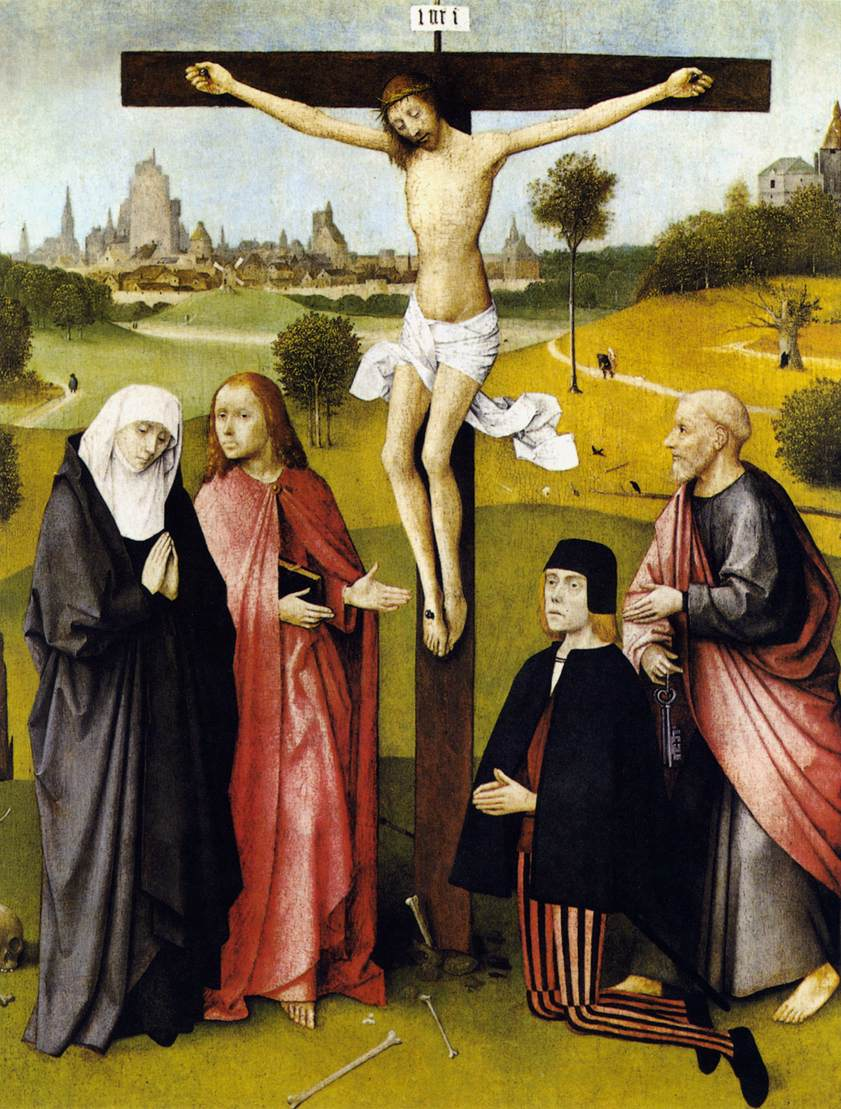
- Artist: Hieronymus Bosch
- Year: c. 1480–1485
- Type: Oil on oak
- Dimensions: 74.7 cm × 61 cm (29.4 in × 24 in)
- Location: Royal Museums of Fine Arts of Belgium; Brussels

Crucifixion With a Donor is an oil painting on oak by the Netherlandish artist Hieronymus Bosch believed to be painted between 1480 and 1485. The painting resides at Royal Museums of Fine Arts of Belgium in Brussels.

== See also ==
- List of paintings by Hieronymus Bosch
