= Saint Christopher Carrying the Christ Child =

Painting by Hieronymus Bosch

St. Christopher Carrying the Christ Child
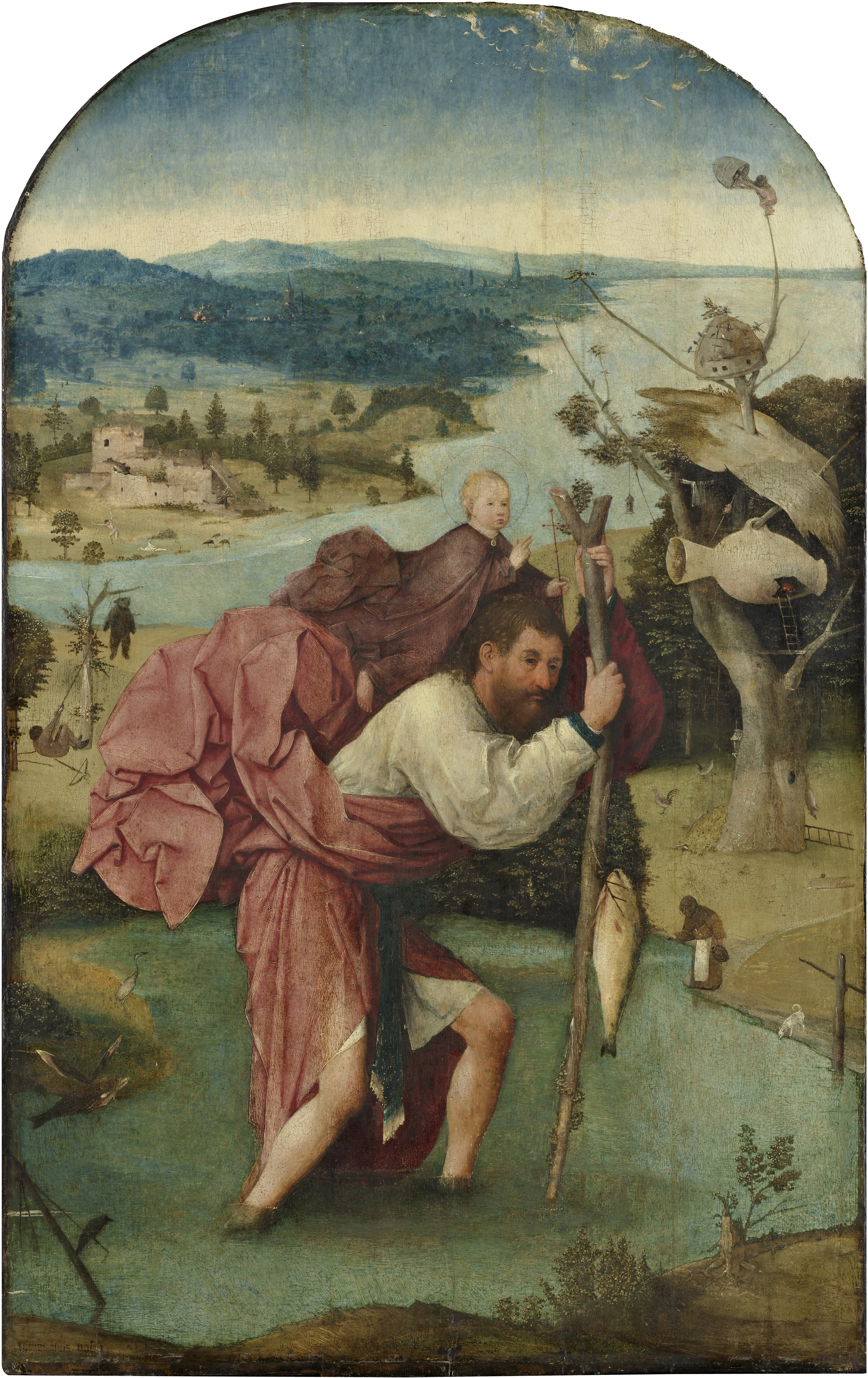
- Artist: Hieronymus Bosch
- Year: c. 1490–1500
- Medium: Oil on panel
- Dimensions: 113 cm × 72 cm (44 in × 28 in)
- Location: Museum Boijmans Van Beuningen, Rotterdam

Saint Christopher Carrying the Christ Child is an oil on panel painting by Dutch painter Hieronymus Bosch, dating to c. 1490–1500. It is in the Museum Boijmans Van Beuningen in Rotterdam.

== See also ==
- List of paintings by Hieronymus Bosch
