= Terrestrial Paradise (Bosch) =

Painting by Hieronymus Bosch

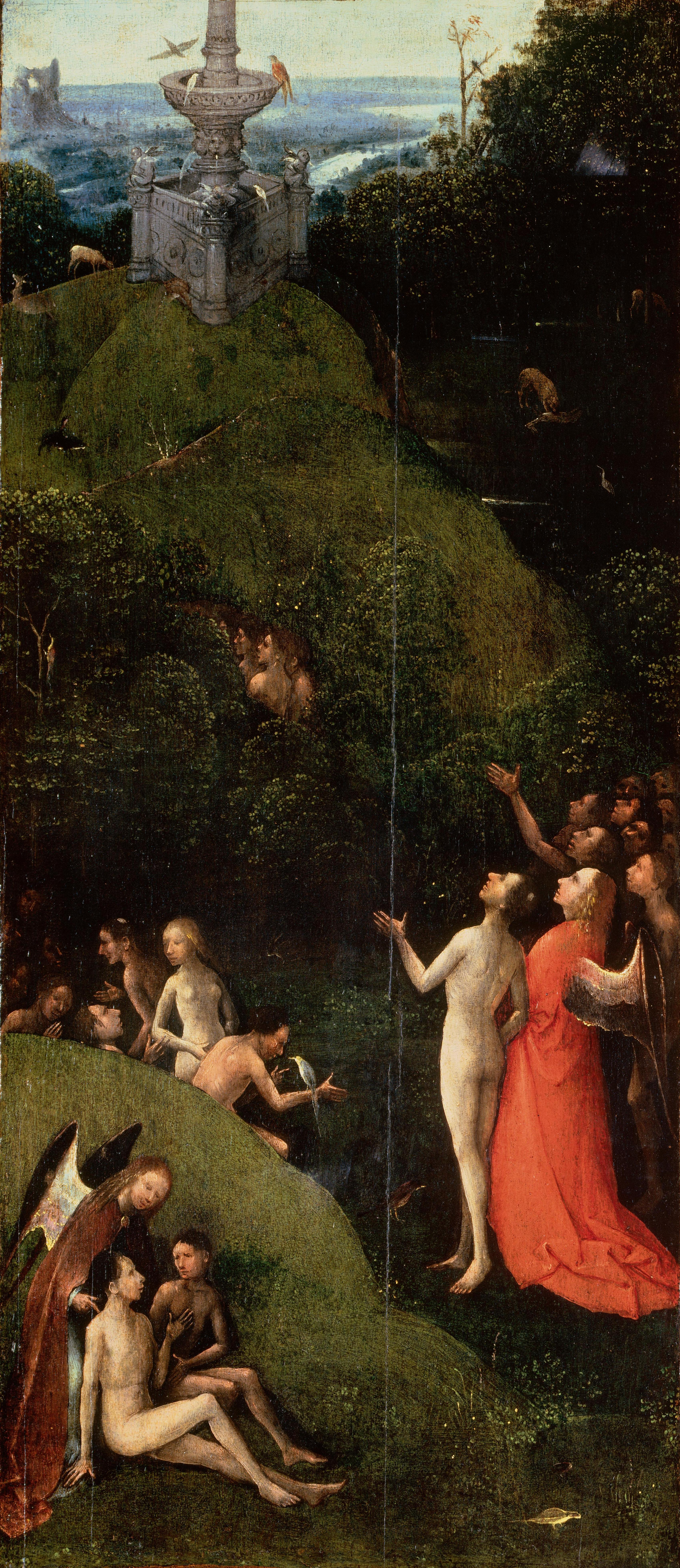
- Artist: Hieronymus Bosch
- Year: Between circa 1490 and circa 1516
- Medium: Oil on oak wood
- Dimensions: 86.5 cm × 39.5 cm (34.1 in × 15.6 in)
- Location: Gallerie dell'Accademia, Venice

Terrestrial Paradise is a painting by Netherlandish artist Hieronymus Bosch, dating from around 1490. It is now in the Gallerie dell'Accademia in Venice, Italy. The painting depicts Terrestrial Paradise, where the remaining sins of the saved were washed away. The Fountain of Life stands on top of the hill.

This artwork is part of a series of four, the others are Ascent of the Blessed, Fall of the Damned into Hell and Hell.

== See also ==
- List of paintings by Hieronymus Bosch
