= Christ Child with a Walking Frame =

Painting by Hieronymus Bosch

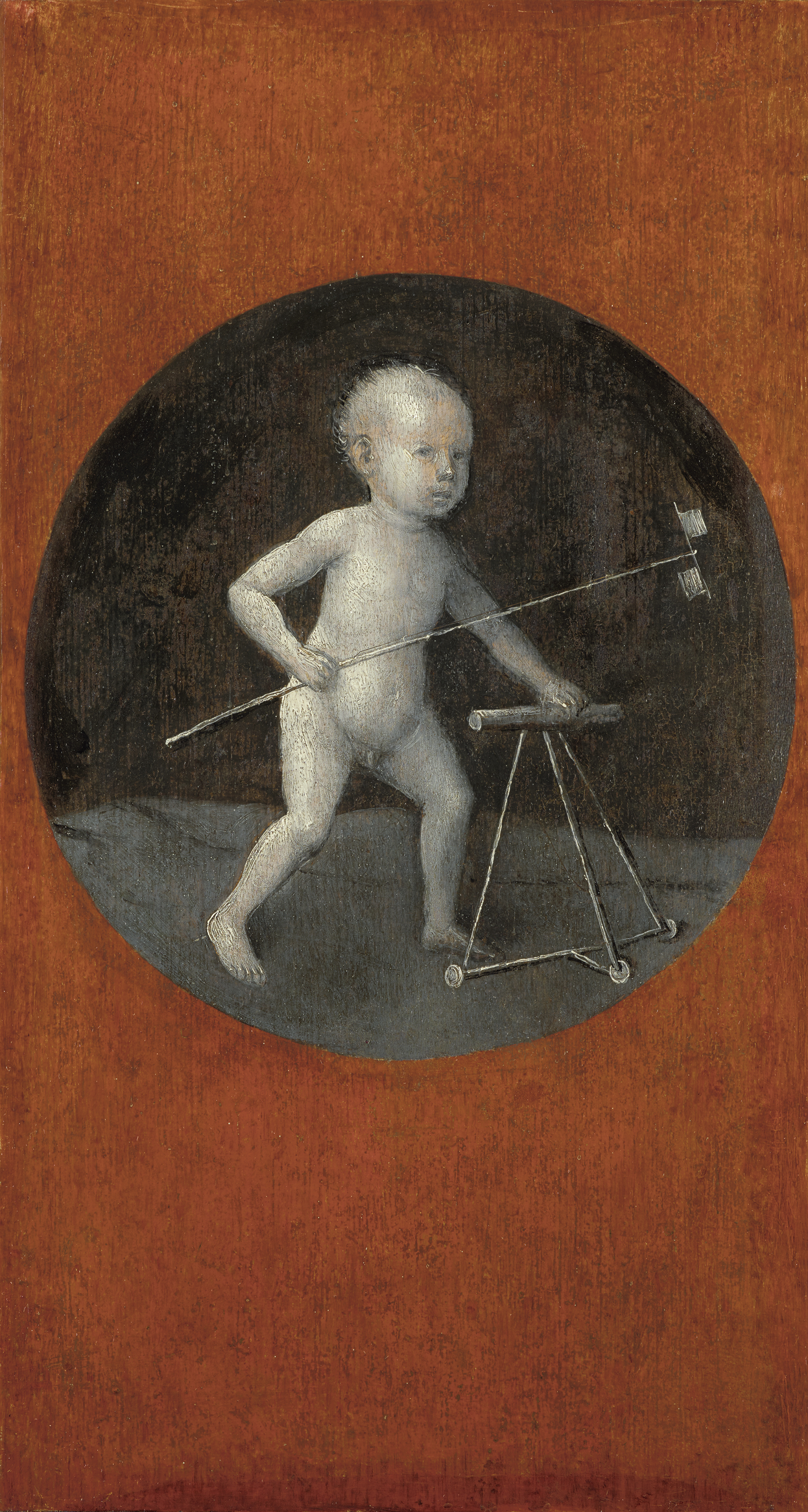
- Artist: Hieronymus Bosch
- Year: 1480s
- Medium: oil on panel
- Dimensions: 28 cm diameter (11 in)
- Location: Kunsthistorisches Museum, Vienna

Christ Child with a Walking Frame is a part of an altarpiece by Netherlandish artist Hieronymus Bosch, painted on the reverse of his Christ Carrying the Cross. Measuring 28 centimetres (11 inches) in diameter, it is at the Kunsthistorisches Museum (Museum of Art History), Vienna, Austria.

The baby's first halting steps parallel Christ struggling with the Cross on the obverse, while the whirligig in his hand alludes to the Cross itself.

== See also ==
- List of paintings by Hieronymus Bosch
