= Fall of the Damned into Hell =

Painting by Hieronymus Bosch

Fall of the Damned
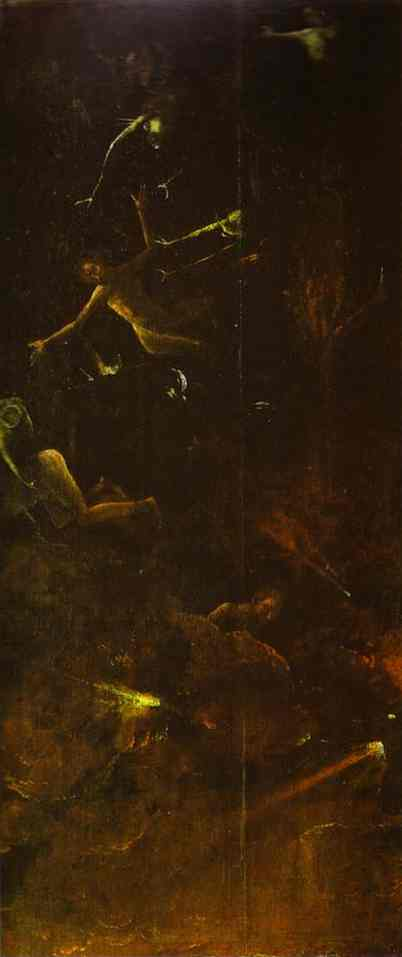
- Artist: Hieronymus Bosch
- Year: before 1490
- Dimensions: 86.5 cm × 39.5 cm (34.1 in × 15.6 in)
- Location: Gallerie dell'Accademia; Venice

Fall of the Damned into Hell is a painting by the Early Netherlandish artist Hieronymus Bosch made sometime before 1490. It is currently in the Gallerie dell'Accademia in Venice, Italy.

This painting is part of a four-panel polyptych; the others are Ascent of the Blessed, Terrestrial Paradise and Hell.

== See also ==
- List of paintings by Hieronymus Bosch
