= Head of a Woman =

Head of a Woman may refer to:

- Head of a Woman (Bosch), a Hieronymus Bosch painting fragment.
- Head of a Woman (Leonardo da Vinci), painted around 1500
- Head of a Woman (Delacroix), 1823
- Head of a Woman (Fernande Olivier) by Pablo Picasso, 1909

== See also ==
- Woman's Head
