= Ecce Homo (Bosch, Frankfurt) =

Painting by Hieronymus Bosch

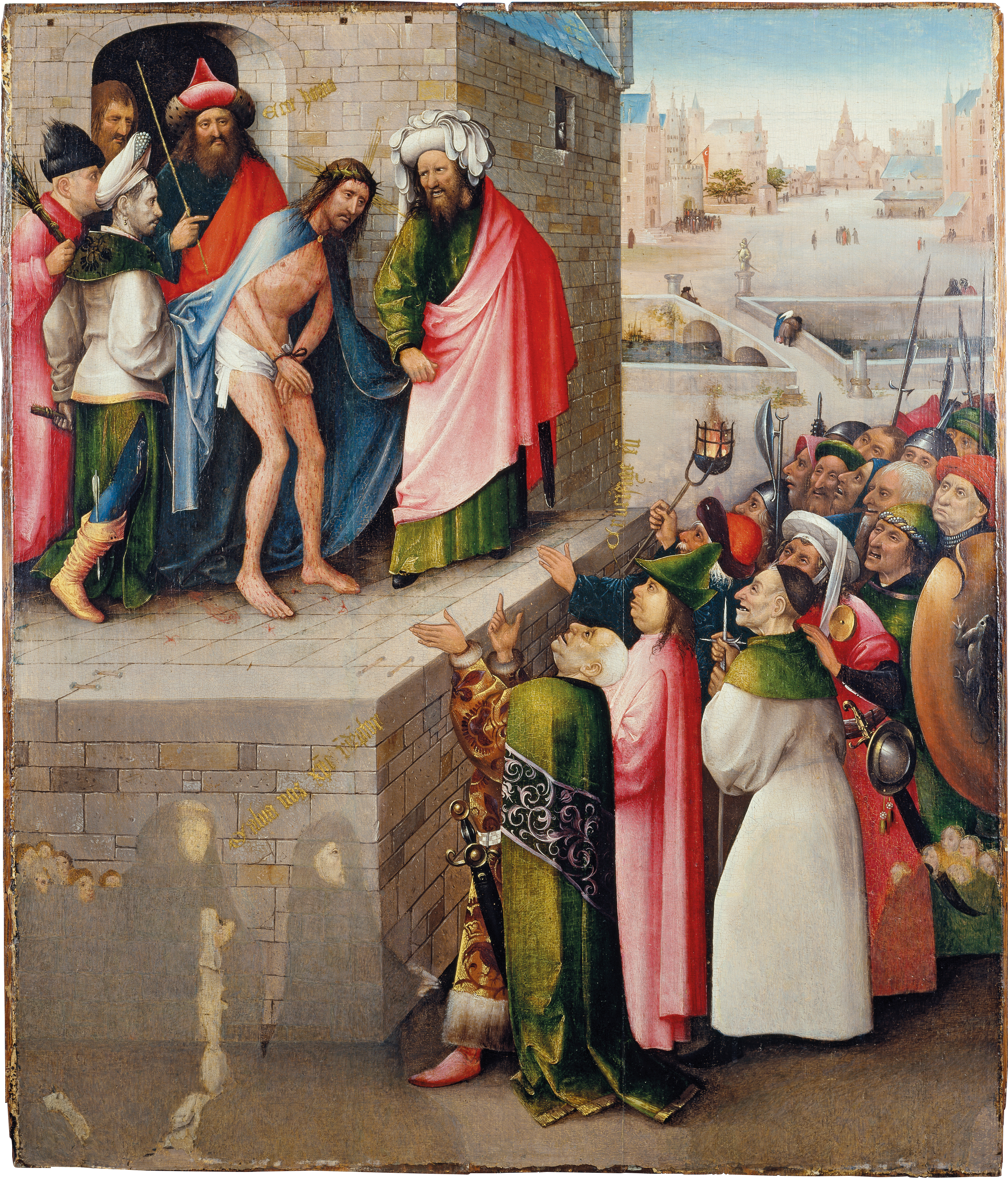
- Artist: Hieronymus Bosch
- Year: c. 1475–1485
- Medium: Tempera and oil on oak panel
- Dimensions: 71 cm × 61 cm (28 in × 24 in)
- Location: Städel Museum; Frankfurt

Ecce Homo is a painting of the episode in the Passion of Jesus by the Early Netherlandish painter Hieronymus Bosch, painted between 1475 and 1485. The original version, with a provenance in collections in Ghent, is in the Städel Museum in Frankfurt; a copy is held the Museum of Fine Arts in Boston. The painting takes its title from the Latin words Ecce Homo, "Behold the Man" spoken by the Roman Prefect Pontius Pilate when Jesus is paraded before a baying, angry mob in Jerusalem before he is sentenced to be crucified.

== Description ==
Ecce Homo shows Jesus stripped and brought before the people by the members of the Roman council, who are flanked by soldiers. The people mock and jeer Jesus, who wears a Crown of Thorns. His hands are bound with shackles, while the redness of the now raw flesh on his legs, hands and chest attests to the fact that he has been beaten with a scourge. The dialogue between Pilate and the mob is indicated by three Gothic inscriptions placed near the mouths of the protagonists. These function in a similar manner to banderoles or the speech balloons used in modern comic strips. To Pilate's cry of Ecce Homo the mob reply Crucifige Eum (Crucify Him). A third inscription Salve nos Christe redemptor (Save us, Christ Redeemer) can be seen in the lower left of the canvas, from the mouths of what were the representations of two donors, but which were later painted over. Typical of Bosch, the painting is suffused with symbolic imagery. Most notable are the placing two animals traditionally seen as emblems of evil in Christian iconography—an owl perched above Pilate, and a giant toad seen resting on the shield of one of the soldiers.

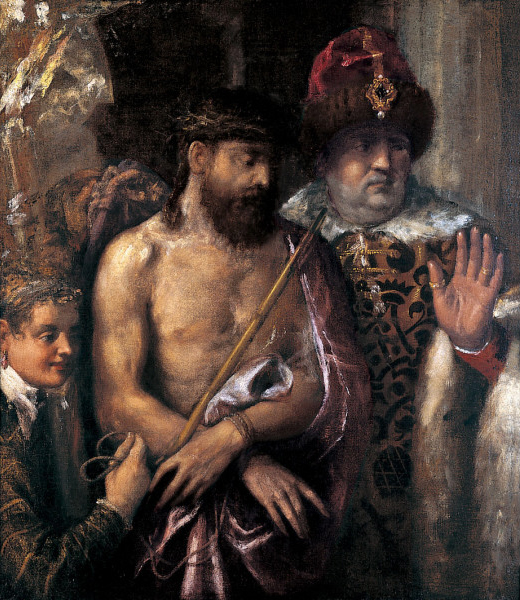
Titian's Ecce Homo (1570–1576) shows a masculine Christ who is calmly acceptant of his fate, and not subject to the humiliation suffered by the frail figure in Bosch's work.

The upper right quadrant of the composition presents an all-but-autonomous cityscape that represents Jerusalem under the familiar guise of a Late Gothic Netherlandish town. Its large open spaces, eerily empty, form the strongest contrast to the densely packed jostle of grotesquely caricatured and exotically garbed figures of the foreground mob.

The theme of Ecce Homo was not often taken up by painters before the Renaissance, and Bosch is one of the best known early artists to take on the scene. Typically, this episode of the Passion takes one of two forms. One representation details a literal narration of the event, with the implied conclusion that the judgement offered by one's contemporaries is often, as the art historian Michael Worton wrote, "flawed, blind, and riven with self-interest." This is the tradition to which this work belongs: Christ is shown to be utterly human and is shown as a stooped, humiliated, man. Later High Renaissance depictions focus on the heroic sacrifice Christ is making for the sake of mankind, and often eliminate the jeering mob altogether, to show an accepting Christ almost looking forward to death.

Very little is known of Bosch's life, and as with a great many of his paintings, the dating of this work is uncertain. However, because of the relative simplicity of the figures and the fact that, thematically, it closely resembles other works painted during the period, it is generally believed to have been completed between 1475 and 1480. This Ecce Homo contains many elements typical of Netherlandish painting of the time, including homely faces and slight proportions of the figures, who seem to be rendered flatly, while their physique fails to be substantial under their heavy clothes. The recent dendrochronological investigation of the oak panel places the time of the creation of the painting approximately between 1475 and 1485.

== Painting materials ==
The investigation by the scientist at The Bosch Research and Conservation Project has revealed the use of the usual pigments of the Renaissance period such as azurite, lead-tin-yellow and vermilion. He also employed red and green glazes and gold leaf.

== See also ==
- List of paintings by Hieronymus Bosch

== Sources ==
- Bosing, Walter (2000). Hieronymus Bosch, c. 1450–1516 : between heaven and hell. London: Taschen. ISBN 3-8228-5856-0. OCLC 45329900.
- Falk, Kurt (2008). The unknown Hieronymus Bosch. Benson, N.C. Berkeley, Calif. East Montpelier, Vt: Goldenstone Press North Atlantic Books Heaven & Earth Pub. ISBN 978-1-55643-759-5. OCLC 223107085.
- Gibson, Walter (1973). Hieronymus Bosch (in Polish). London: Thames and Hudson. ISBN 0-500-20134-X. OCLC 715062.
- Ilsink, Matthijs (2016). Hieronymus Bosch : painter and draughtsman : catalogue raisonne. Brussels New Haven Place of manufacture not identified: Bosch Research and Conservation Project Mercatorfonds, Yale University Press, manufacturer not identified. pp. 224–235. ISBN 978-0-300-22014-8. OCLC 929592042.
- Worton, Michael (2004). National healths : gender, sexuality and health in a cross-cultural context. London Portland, Or: UCL Cavendish Pub. ISBN 1-84472-017-9. OCLC 852899205.
