= Head of a Halberdier =

Painting by a follower of Hieronymus Bosch

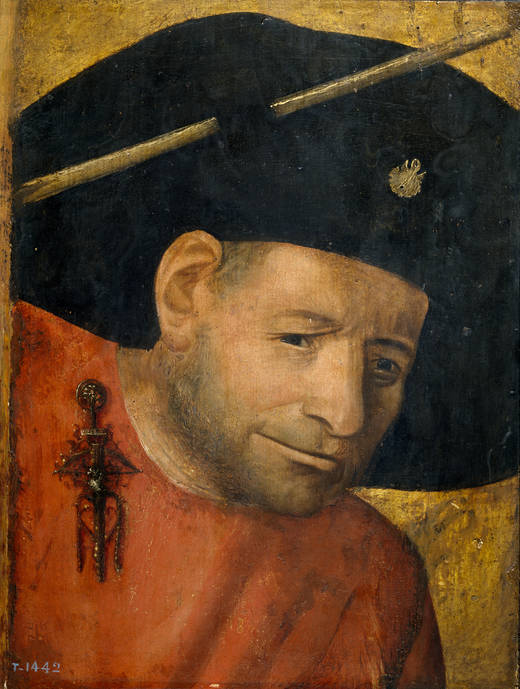
- Artist: Hieronymus Bosch
- Year: 1490s-after 1500
- Medium: oil on panel
- Dimensions: 28 cm × 20 cm (11 in × 7.9 in)
- Location: Museo del Prado, Madrid

Head of a Halberdier is a fragment of a painting by a follower of Netherlandish artist Hieronymus Bosch. It is currently in the Museo del Prado in Madrid. It is thought to be a cropped piece of a larger painting which might have been damaged.

A halberdier is a guard who wields a halberd.
