= List of drawings by Hieronymus Bosch =

This is an incomplete list of drawings by Hieronymus Bosch, many of which have survived to the present day. A number represent alternate incarnations or preparatory sketches for his paintings.

Bosch's works are generally organized into three periods of his life dealing with the early works (c. 1470–1485), the middle period (c. 1485–1500), and the late period (c. 1500 until his death in 1516). According to Stefan Fischer, thirteen of Bosch's surviving paintings were completed in the late period, with seven surviving paintings attributed to his middle period. Bosch's early period is studied in terms of his workshop activity and possibly some of his drawings. There are no surviving paintings attributed to before 1485.

| Image | Title | Year | Type | Size | Location | Details |
|---|---|---|---|---|---|---|
| | Infernal Landscape | | Pen and brown ink | 259 x 197 mm | Private Collection | Infernal Landscape was previously thought to have been made by an assistant in the workshop of Hieronymus Bosch, but has been authenticated as a piece by the master himself by the Bosch Research and Conservation Project (BRCP). (Note: The BRCP is an international art history study that has been researching, analyzing and documenting the oeuvre of the medieval master since 2010.) |
| | Two monsters | | Pen drawing | 86 x 182 mm | Kupferstichkabinett Berlin, Germany | This is a two-sided drawing with Study of Monsters |
| | Study of Monsters | | Pen drawing | 86 x 182 mm | Kupferstichkabinett Berlin | Reverse of Two monsters |
| | Beehive and witches | | Pen and bistre | 192 x 270 mm | Albertina, Vienna, Austria | |
| | Beggars | c. 1465-1516 | Pen and bistre | 285 x 205 mm | Albertina, Vienna | It is unknown whether this drawing is by Bosch or Pieter Brueghel the Elder. |
| | Beggars and Cripples | | Pen and bistre | 264 x 198 mm | Royal Library of Belgium, Brussels | Like the drawing Beggars, it is unknown whether this drawing is by Bosch or Pieter Brueghel the Elder. |
| | Christ Carrying The Cross | | Pen | 236 x 198 mm | Museum Boijmans Van Beuningen, Rotterdam, The Netherlands | Formerly attributed to Bosch. |
| | A comical barber scene | c. 1477-1516 | Pen and brown ink on black chalk | 174 × 207 mm | British Museum, London, United Kingdom | This sketch would later be made into an engraving by Pieter van der Heyden. |
| | Death of the Miser | | | 256 x 149 mm | Musée du Louvre, Paris, France | Although originally thought to have been a preparatory drawing for the painting Death and the Miser, it is now believed that the drawing was executed by a follower of Bosch. (Note: Examination of the underdrawing of the painting Death and the Miser reveals that Bosch shortened Death's arrow in the final version. The length of the arrow in the drawing is equal to the length of the arrow in the painting, rather than in the underdrawing. The unknown artist of the drawing also embellished details including an orthodox cross below the barrel vault. The assertion that the drawing is of Bosch's hand is used by Lynda Harris to support her theory that Bosch was a practitioner of the Cathar religion. The drawing named Death and the Usurer is paired with a similar Ship of Fools drawing which has also been erroneously attributed to Bosch.) |
| | Group of Male Figures | | Pen | 124 x 126 mm | Morgan Library & Museum, New York City, United States | Attribution uncertain. |
| | Mary and John at the Foot of the Cross | | Brush | 302 x 172 mm | Kupferstich-Kabinett, Dresden, Germany | |
| | Nest of Owls | c. 1510s | Pen and bistre | 140 x 196 mm | Museum Boijmans Van Beuningen, Rotterdam | |
| | Scenes in Hell | c. 1465-1516 | Pen and bistre | 163 x 176 mm | Staatliche Museen, Berlin, Germany | Attribution uncertain. |
| | Studies | c. 1465-1516 | Pen and bistre | 205 x 263 mm | Musée du Louvre, Paris | Attribution uncertain |
| | Monsters | | Pen and bistre | 318 x 210 mm | Ashmolean Museum, Oxford, United Kingdom | This is a two-sided drawing with Studies of Monsters (below) |
| | Studies of Monsters | | Pen and bistre | 318 x 210 mm | Ashmolean Museum, Oxford | Reverse of previous drawing Monsters |
| | Temptation of St Anthony | | Pen and bistre | 257 x 175 mm | Staatliche Museen, Berlin | Attribution uncertain. This sketch would later be made into a painting. |
| | The Entombment | c. 1505-1515 | Ink and grey wash | 250 x 350 mm | British Museum, London | Formerly attributed to Bosch. |
| | The Forest that hears and the field that sees | c. 1470-1516 | Pen and bistre | 202 x 127 mm | Staatliche Museen, Berlin | |
| | The Ship of Fools | c. 1500 | Wash on gray paper | | Musée du Louvre, Paris | Done after Bosch by an unknown artist. |
| | Ship in Flames | | Pen and bistre | 176 x 153 mm | Akademie der bildenden Künste, Vienna, Austria | Attribution uncertain. |
| | Man Tree | c. 1470s | Pen and bistre | 277 x 211 mm | Albertina, Vienna | The Man Tree probably appears in the Bosch triptych The Garden of Earthly Delights. |
| | Two Caricatured Heads | | Pen and bistre | 133 x 100 mm | Lehmann Collection, Metropolitan Museum of Art, New York City | |
| | Two Monsters | c. 1470-1516 | Pen and bistre | 164 x 116 mm | Kupferstichkabinett Berlin | This is a two-sided drawing with Turtle and a winged demon (below) |
| | Turtle and a winged demon | 1470-1516 | Pen and bistre | 164 x 116 mm | Kupferstichkabinett Berlin | Reverse of previous Two monsters |
| | Two Witches | | Pen and bistre | 125 x 85 mm | Museum Boijmans Van Beuningen, Rotterdam | |
| | Witches | | Pen and bistre | 203 x 264 mm | Musée du Louvre, Paris | Brueghel's name appears on this drawing, however it is widely accepted as Bosch's. |

== See also ==
- List of paintings by Hieronymus Bosch
