= Christ Carrying the Cross (Bosch, Vienna) =

Painting by Hieronymous Bosch

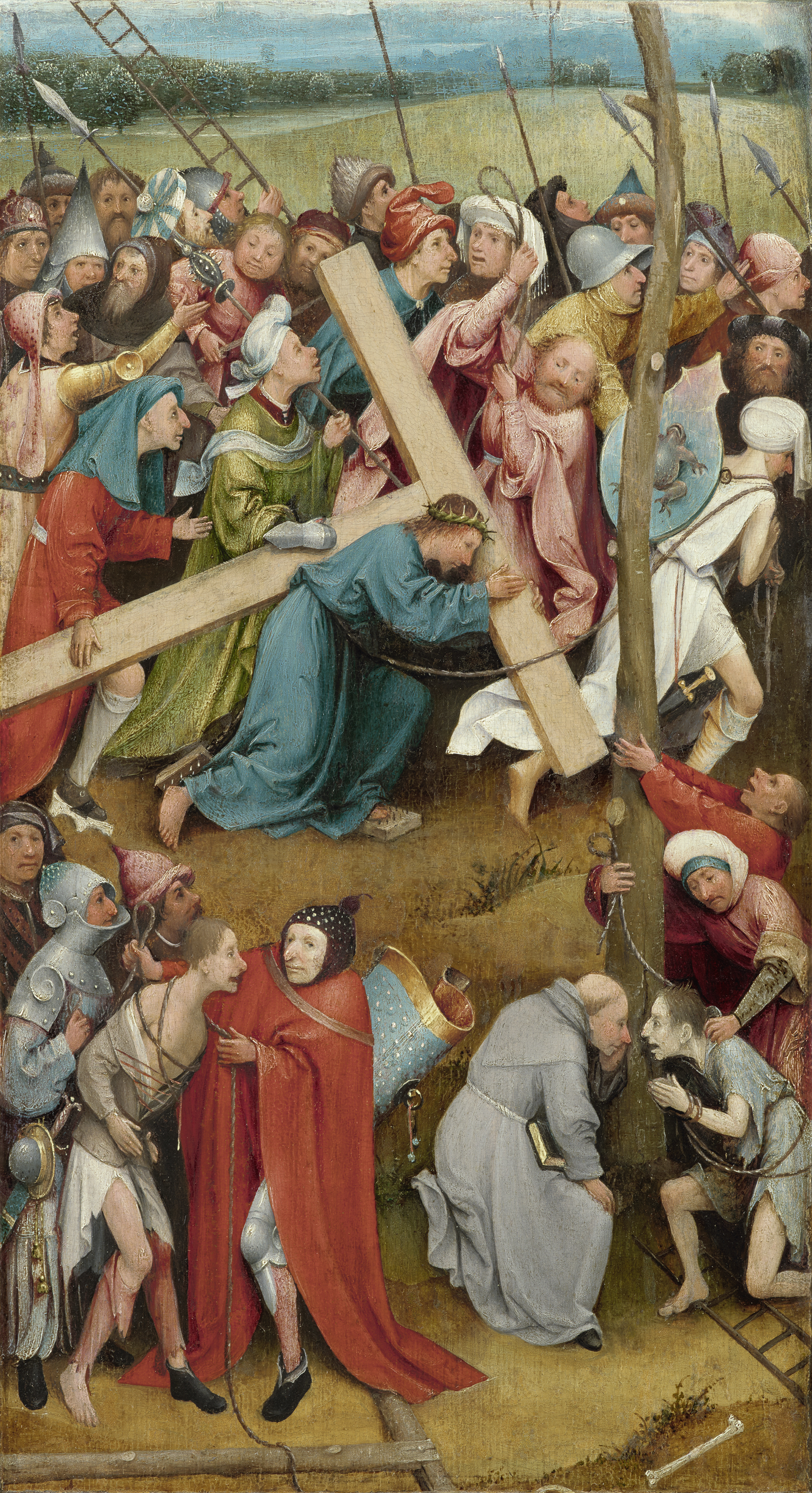
- Artist: Hieronymus Bosch
- Year: c. 1490-1500
- Medium: Oil on panel
- Dimensions: 57 cm × 32 cm (22 in × 13 in)
- Location: Kunsthistorisches Museum, Vienna

Christ Carrying the Cross (Dutch: Kruisdraging) is an oil on panel painting by the Dutch artist Hieronymus Bosch, executed most likely c. 1490–1500. It is at the Kunsthistorisches Museum, in Vienna, Austria.

Christ Child with a Walking Frame is painted on the back of this painting.

== See also ==
- List of paintings by Hieronymus Bosch
- Christ Carrying the Cross (Bosch, Ghent)
- Christ Carrying the Cross (Bosch, Madrid)
