= The Crucifixion of Saint Wilgefortis =

c. 1497 painting by Hieronymus Bosch

- Artist: Hieronymus Bosch
- Year: c. 1497
- Medium: Oil on panel
- Dimensions: 104 cm × 119 cm (41 in × 47 in)
- Location: Gallerie dell'Accademia, Venice

The Crucifixion of Saint Wilgefortis is a c. 1497 triptych by the Early Netherlandish painter Hieronymus Bosch. The subject of the painting has been uncertain, and it has also been known as the Triptych of the Crucified Martyr, or The Crucifixion of Saint Julia, but is now believed to depict Saint Wilgefortis (also known as St Uncumber or St Liberata).

Like many Bosch paintings, the date of this work was long disputed, until dendrochronological analysis assigned it to around 1497. It was held in the Palazzo Ducale in Venice, and now in the collection of the Gallerie dell'Accademia in Venice.

== Description ==
Infrared reflectogram showing the overpainted donor portraits in the side panels

The three panels of the triptych are made from oak. The central round-topped panel measures 105 cm × 63 cm (41 in × 25 in) and depicts the crucifixion of a female saint before a crowd of spectators. In a depiction related to Christ's crucifixion, the woman is in an elevated position against the sky, looking up to her salvation, balanced by a large crowd gathered at the foot of the cross, including executioners and common people, with the typical element of a fainting man supported by his neighbours.

The crucified female figure was often identified as Saint Julia of Corsica, the Carthaginian slave of a Roman citizen Eusebius; she was reputedly crucified by a magistrate Felix for refusing to worship the pagan gods. The painting was restored from 2013 to 2015 to include in an exhibition to mark the 500th anniversary of Bosch's death in 2016. The restoration revealed the saint is bearded, reinforcing the identification as Saint Wilgefortis (also known as St Uncumber in England, or as St Liberata in Italy); she was a young woman who reputedly took a vow of virginity, and prayed to lose her beauty to avoid an unwanted marriage at her father's instigation to a Muslim king: the engagement was cancelled when she miraculously grew a beard, and her father had her crucified.

The half-size side panels depict, to the left, a hermit with a dark hood (perhaps St. Anthony) on a parapet before a city with people fleeing from a fire. To the right, a monk and a soldier – traditionally identified as slave-dealers – point at the central panel, with a port in the background which has fanciful domed buildings and several sunken ships in the harbour. X-rays and infrared reflectograms have revealed that each side panel originally included a portrait of a large kneeling man, but these donor portraits were painted over by Bosch.

The painting is signed to lower left of the central panel "Jheronimus bosch". The back has been cradled and any images on the back of the side panels, which would be visible when the doors were closed, have been lost.

== History ==
According to some historians, Bosch could have painted this work during a short trip to northern Italy, although it is more likely that it was a commission from an Italian trader or diplomat active in Flanders. The work has been damaged by a fire, although its attribution to Bosch has never been disputed. It is one of the few paintings to bear Bosch’s signature.

The earliest mention of the triptych comes from the 1771 treatise Della pittura veneziana, as located in the "Sala dell'Eccelso Tribunale" at the Palazzo Ducale (the Doge's Palace). While Venice was under Austrian control, the painting was taken to Vienna in 1838, but it was returned to Venice in 1919. It is now in the Gallerie dell'Accademia in Venice.

== See also ==
- List of paintings by Hieronymus Bosch

== Sources ==
- Saint Wilgefortis Triptych, boschproject.org
- 56793, Netherlands Institute for Art History (RKD)
