= Head of a Woman (Bosch) =

Fragment of a Hieronymus Bosch painting

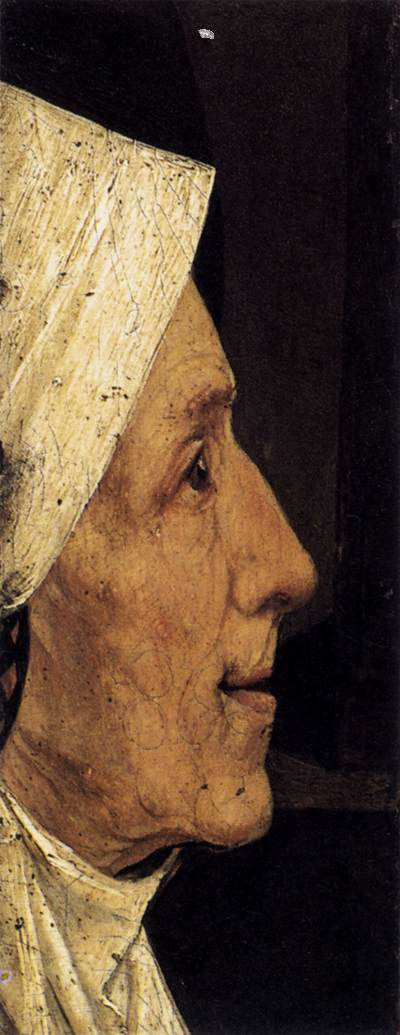
- Artist: Hieronymus Bosch
- Year: c. 1500
- Medium: oil on panel
- Dimensions: 13 cm × 5 cm (5.1 in × 2.0 in)
- Location: Museum Boijmans Van Beuningen, Rotterdam

Head of a Woman is a fragment of a Hieronymus Bosch painting, created c. 1500. It is currently in the Museum Boijmans Van Beuningen in Rotterdam, Netherlands. The fragment is only 13 cm tall and 5 cm wide.

== See also ==
- List of paintings by Hieronymus Bosch
