= The Marriage Feast at Cana (Bosch) =

Post 1550 painting

The Marriage Feast At Cana
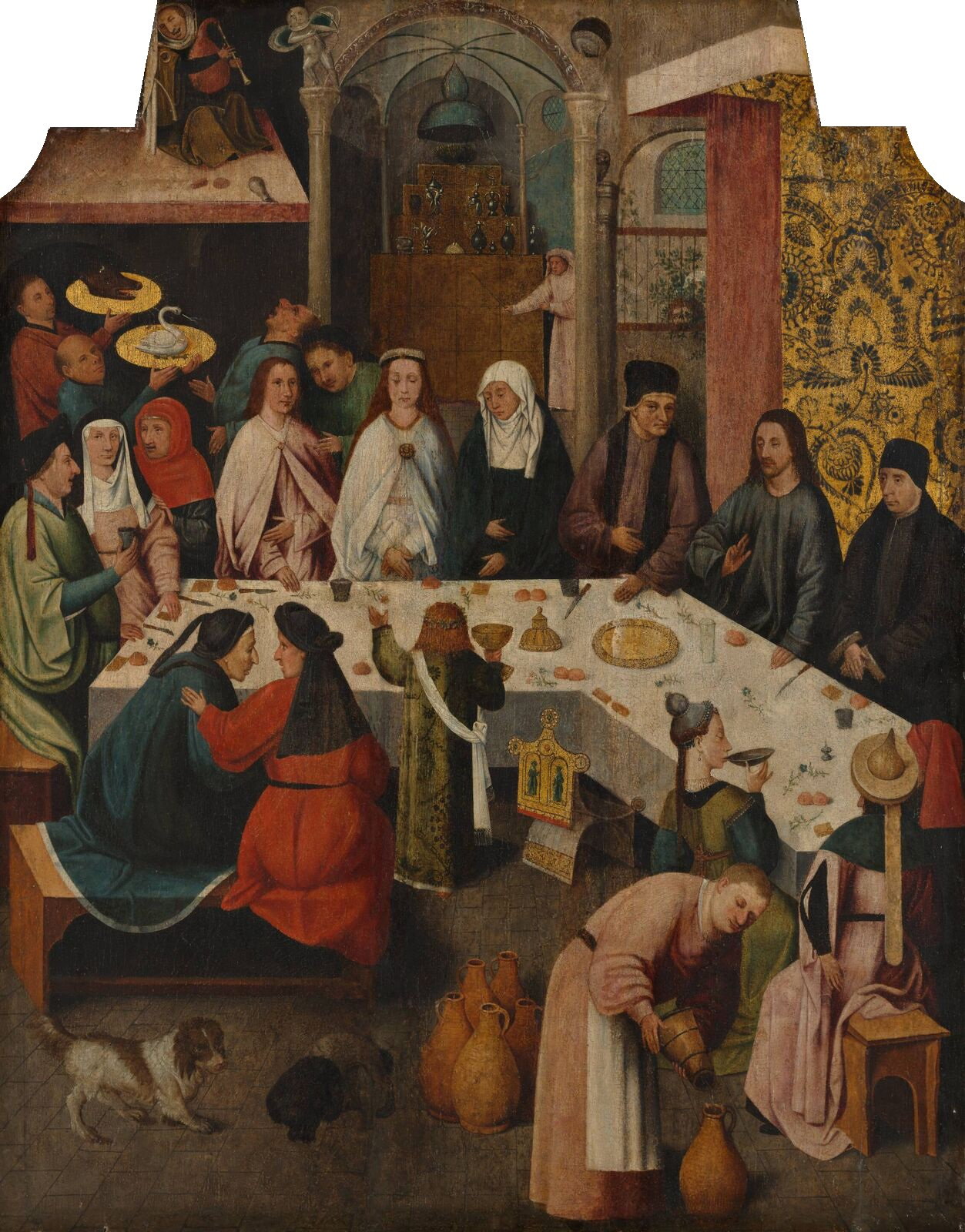
- Artist: Traditionally attributed to Hieronymus Bosch
- Year: Around 1500
- Medium: Oil on panel
- Dimensions: 93 cm × 72 cm (37 in × 28 in)
- Location: Museum Boijmans Van Beuningen

The Marriage Feast At Cana is a painting that was formerly attributed to the Early Netherlandish master Hieronymus Bosch. The painting is in the Museum Boijmans Van Beuningen in Rotterdam, the Netherlands. Several copies exist of this picture. The copy in Boijmans had been considered the original. Dendrochronological analysis has proven conclusively that it was painted a little before 1500

== Provenance ==
A wedding-feast by or after Bosch belonged to the Rubens collection in Antwerp. The painting at Boijmans was bought in Antwerp by an English painter. It has been sawed down and the upper corners subsequently shaped into steps. At the time it showed a portrait and only when the overpainting was removed did the tempera painting of the wedding come to light. “What was revealed was a poor, not to say, wholly disfigured, painting”.

== Sources ==
- van Asperen de Boer, J.R.J.; et al. (1994). Van Eyck to Bruegel. Rotterdam: Museum Boymans Van Beuningen.
