= Christ Carrying the Cross (Bosch, Madrid) =

Painting by Hieronymus Bosch

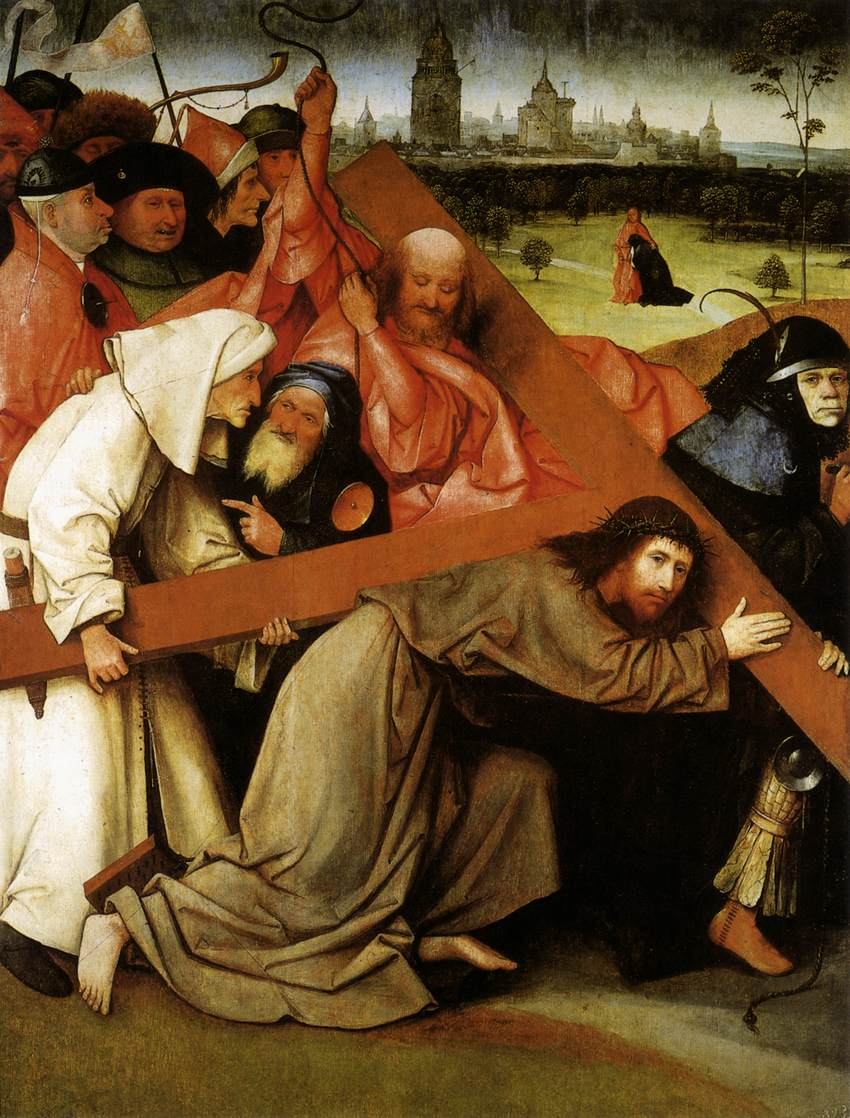
- Artist: Hieronymus Bosch
- Year: c. 1505–1507
- Medium: Oil on panel
- Dimensions: 150 cm × 94 cm (59 in × 37 in)
- Location: Palacio Real, Madrid

Christ Carrying the Cross is an oil on panel painting created c. 1505–1507 by the Early Netherlandish artist Hieronymus Bosch. It is held at Palacio Real, in Madrid.

== See also ==
- List of paintings by Hieronymus Bosch
- Christ Carrying the Cross (Bosch, Vienna)
- Christ Carrying the Cross (Bosch, Ghent)
