= Death of the Reprobate =

Painting by Hieronymus Bosch

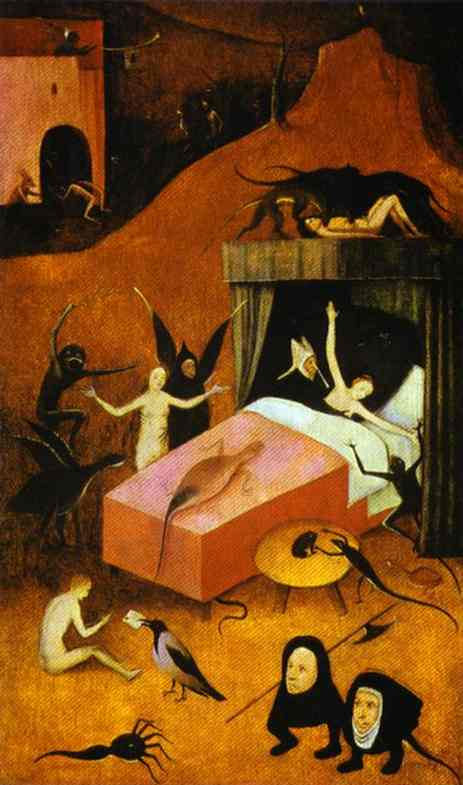
- Artist: Hieronymus Bosch

Death of the Reprobate (33.4 x 19.6 cm) is an oil on panel painting by a follower of Hieronymus Bosch which depicts the deathbed struggle for the human soul between an angel and a demon. It is held in a private collection in New York City, United States.

The painting is likely a copy of detail from a larger hell panel. It dates from the second half of the 16th century.

The style is somewhat similar to his Death of the Miser.
