= Christ Carrying the Cross (Richier) =

Sculpture attributed to Ligier Richier

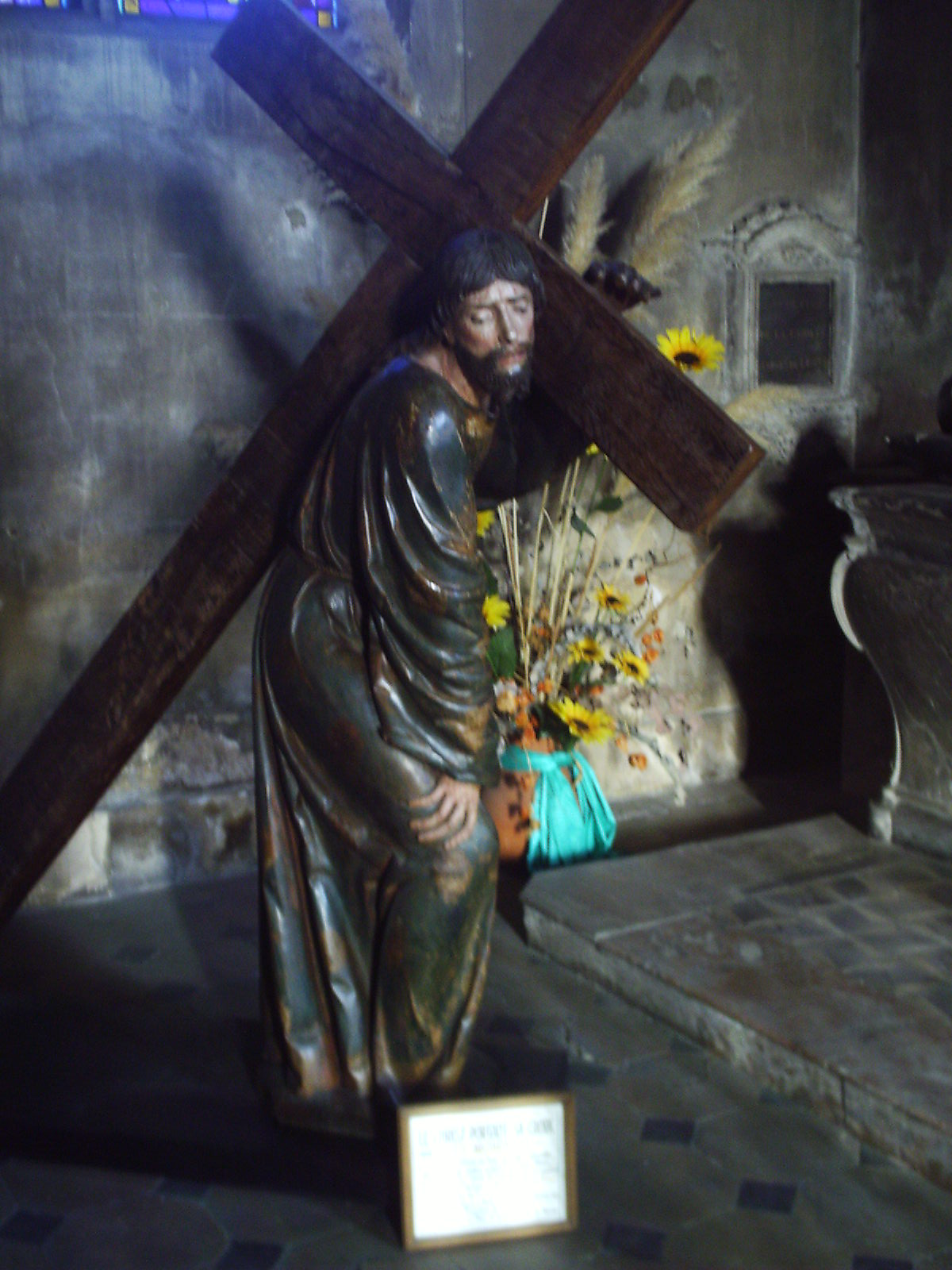
Christ carrying the Cross. Height: 180 cm

Christ Carrying the Cross (French: Le Christ Portant Sa Croix) is a 15th-century polychrome oak sculpture attributed to the French sculptor Ligier Richier in the Église de Saint-Laurent in Pont-à-Mousson in Meurthe-et-Moselle. It is thought to have come from the chapel of "Mount Olive" erected by Philippe de Gueldres in the garden of the Clarisses monastery in Pont-à-Mousson.

The sculpture was designated as a Monument historique in 1934.

== Sources ==
- Denis, Paul. Ligier Richier, l’artiste et son œuvre. Paris-Nancy: Berger-Levrault, 1911
