= Christ Carrying the Cross (Bosch, Ghent) =

Painting by a follower of Hieronymus Bosch

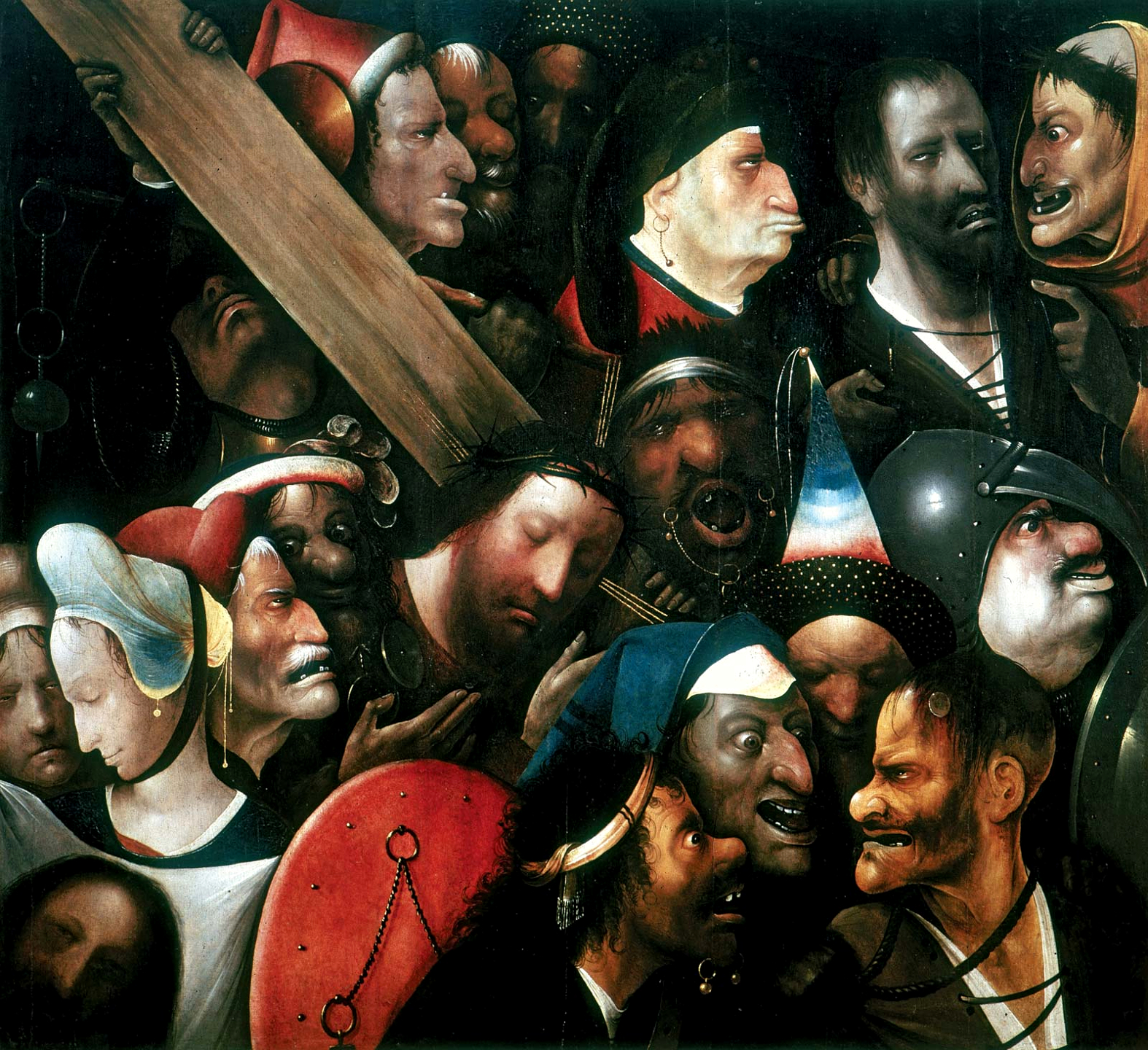
- Artist: a follower of Hieronymus Bosch
- Year: c. 1510–1535
- Medium: Oil on panel
- Dimensions: 74 cm × 81 cm (29 in × 32 in)
- Location: Museum of Fine Arts, Ghent

Christ Carrying the Cross (also referred to as Christ Bearing the Cross) is a painting attributed to a follower of Hieronymus Bosch. It was painted in the early 16th century, presumably between 1510 and 1535. The work is housed in the Museum of Fine Arts in Ghent, Belgium. Various aspects of the painting have been a source of scholarly debate. The painting is notable for its use of caricature to provide grotesque-looking faces surrounding Jesus and is an expression of Bosch's pessimistic views. It exhibits Christian imagery and symbolism, deriving its core elements from the Bible.

== History ==
The work was bought by the Museum of Fine Arts, Ghent in 1902, and was restored in 1956–1957. As for all Bosch-related works, the dating is uncertain, although most art historians assigned it to his late career. The catalogue of the Bosch exhibition held in Rotterdam in 2001 assigned it to 1510–1535, attributing the execution to a follower. According to one of the authors, Bernard Vermet, that it is not a typical work of Bosch it is generally accepted and he finds it hard to believe that it was painted by the same painter as the Christ Crowned with Thorns in the National Gallery in London. Moreover, the colours remind him of the Mannerists of the 1530s and he relates the work to the Triptych of the Passion in Valencia and the Christ Before Pilate in Princeton, works that were definitely painted after the death of Bosch. Since then the rejection has been accepted by Stephan Fischer and disputed by Fritz Koreny.

In October 2015 the Bosch Research and Conservation Project, which has been doing technical research on most of Bosch's paintings since 2007, confirmed they reject the attribution to Bosch as well and consider it to be made by a follower. It was proposed by the Bosch Research and Conservation Project (BRCP), that the piece is in fact a replica of a previous piece of Bosch. According to them, the piece should be dated from 1530 to 1540, which is after Bosch’s death. Other evidence that the BRCP uses to support their attribution is that when studying the painting with infrared reflectography, the under drawing of the piece does not show many differences to the final piece, which is usually expected. When studying the structure and composition of the painting, the BRCP insists that they are dealing with a different artist. It was also determined that the painting was directly placed into a frame after painting due to the fact that there was no paint pooling at the edges of the piece. It was standard procedure within the 15th century that pieces were framed before painting, which would show evidence of this build up of paint on the edges of the panel.

However, this theory is refuted by Griet Stayaert. His evidence is that there is no way to determine definitively the framing technique of the piece. During the restoration of the piece in 1956-1957, wooden slats were added to frame the piece, so it could not be determined that the piece had unpainted edges to begin with. He also aims to consider that the style of the painting itself is affected by the restoration process. Stayaert compares the attributes of the painting to other paintings by Bosch and marks its similarity to The Last Judgment by Bosch and Christ Mocked (The Crowning of Thorns) by Bosch as well.

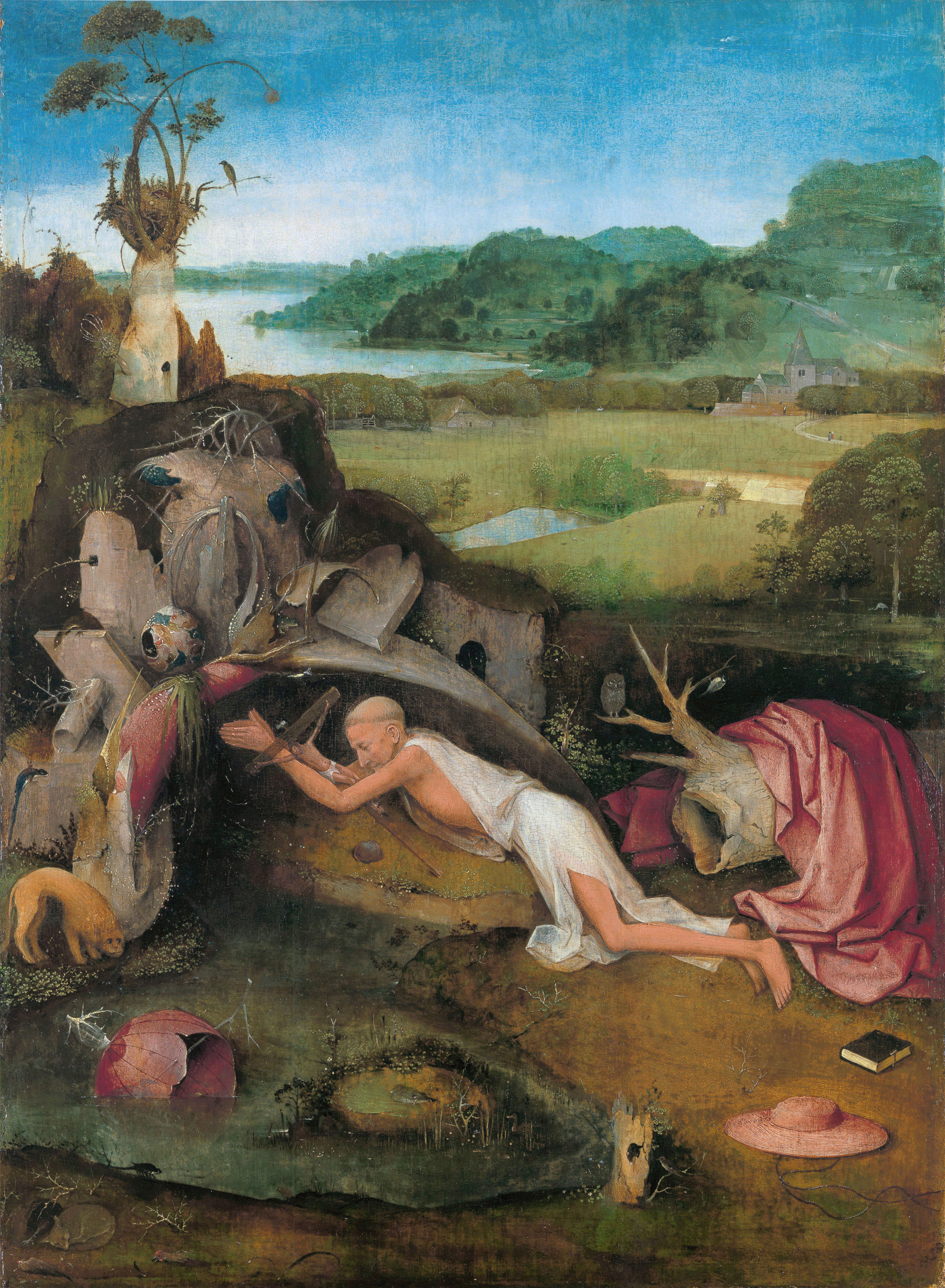
Hieronymus Bosch, Saint Jerome, oil on oak panels, 77 cm × 59 cm (30 in × 23 in), Museum of Fine Arts, Ghent

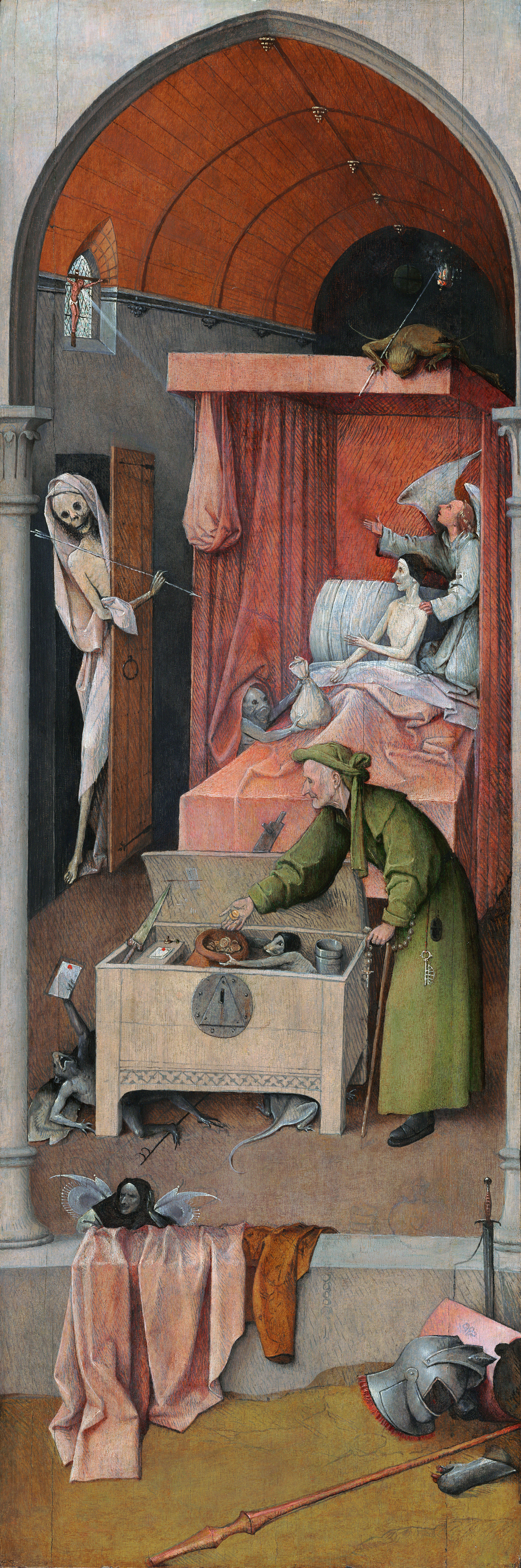
Hieronymus Bosch, Death and the Miser, oil on oak panels, 93 cm × 32 cm (36 5/8 in × 12 13/16 in), National Gallery of Art, Washington, D.C.

Another art historian that adds insight to this claim is Maximiliaan Martens. His main point being that art history is not an exact science and it still needs people to interpret its conclusions. In his own study of this painting through infrared reflectograms, he compared the underdrawings of Christ Carrying the Cross to other pieces attributed to Hieronymous Bosch, Saint Jerome and Death and the Miser. He determined that the under drawings of the three paintings are different from one another. Christ Carrying the Cross has a linear under drawing, Saint Jerome has a free under drawing, and Death and the Miser has a crowded crosshatching under drawing. However, he stresses that there are instances where methods of under drawing have changed across pieces that have been confirmed to have the same artist. He cites works of Raphael and Pieter Bruegel I, stating that their under drawings evolve through the years.

Hieronymus Bosch, The Garden of Earthly Delights, oil on oak panels, 205.5 cm × 384.9 cm (81 in × 152 in), Museo del Prado, Madrid

Yet another art historian Paul van de Broeck insists that this change in style is attributed to the artistic process of Bosch. He describes him as a "paradoxical artist". Van de Broeck states that Bosch's purposefully contrasts his under drawing with his final product, often exhibiting exempla contraria. This is a concept of showing "how it should not be". There an even be found differences in style amongst the same piece. In The Garden of Earthy Delights, there are changes in style across the three panels of the piece.

Many art historians believe that the distortion and anguish in Bosch's pieces are inspired by Leonardo da Vinci's sketches, among them being Kurt Falk. This is specifically referring to the sketches where da Vinci experimented with the distortion of faces and the body. However, others argue that his inspiration was not that of Leonardo da Vinci, but they showed aspects of the northern tradition. Walter Gibson states that Bosch's work has very little resemblance to da Vinci's work and are in actuality reflect German and Dutch works where the persecutors of Jesus Christ are depicted as animalistic.

Christ Carrying the Cross is the conclusion of a series by Bosch where he developed his half-figure Passion scenes. This series started with Christ Crowned with Thorns.

== Description ==
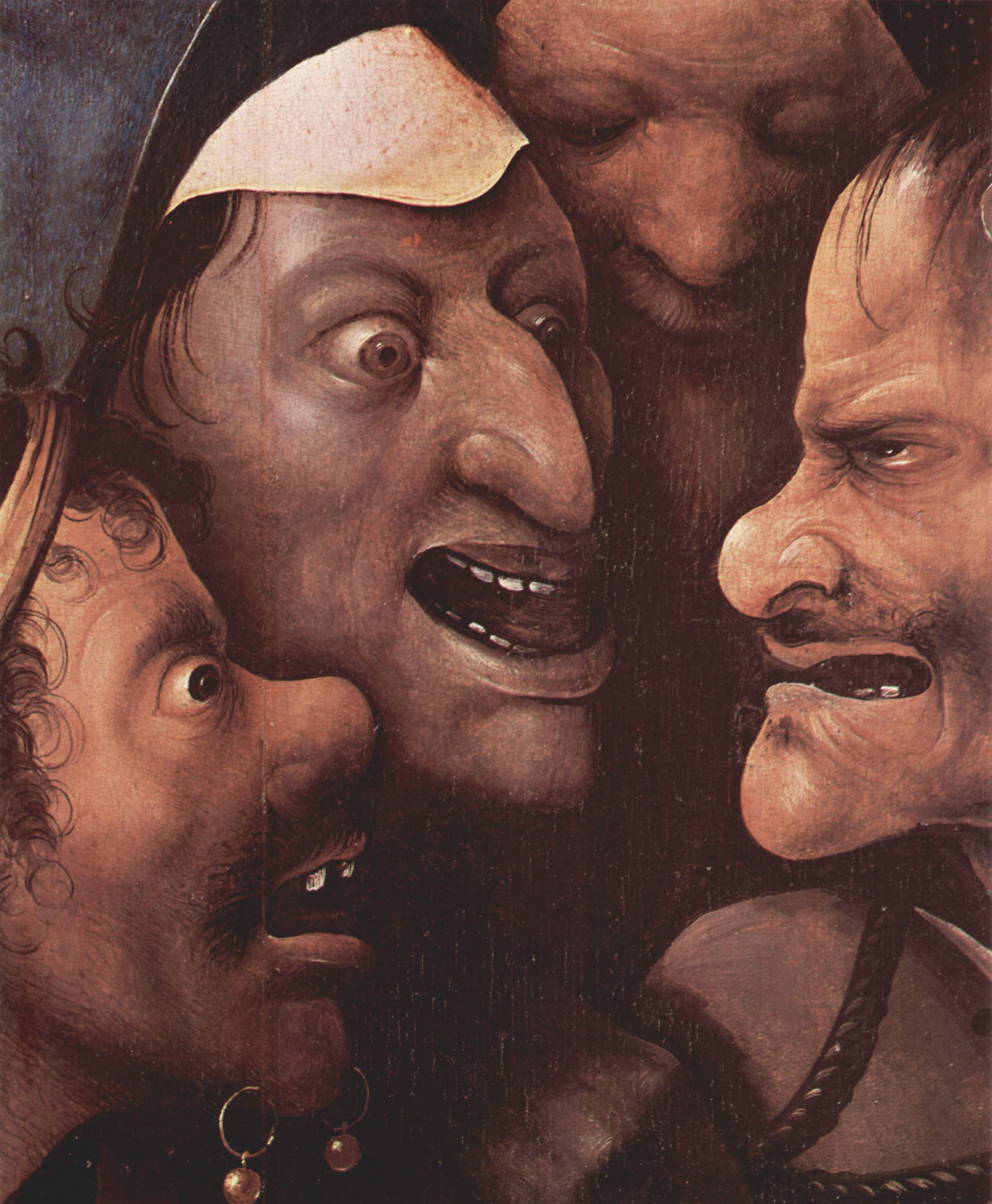
Detail of the painting

The work depicts Jesus carrying the cross above a dark background, primarily with black and red tones, surrounded by numerous heads. This painting focuses solely on the face and hands as a source of emotional expression, bodies being faded into the dark background. Most of the heads are characterized with grotesque features. Some describe this distortion as resembling abstract expression. There are a total of eighteen portraits, plus one on St. Veronica's veil. Both Jesus and St. Veronica have their eyes closed and hold a woeful expression with their heads inclining. The depiction of Jesus is almost transparent, which makes the viewer wonder if he is to fade away, questioning if he is to last to the end. The contrast between the expressions of Christ's tormentors and Christ's solemn expression is supposed to express the difference between the selflessness of Jesus and the seething anger of those that are against him.

In the bottom right corner is the impenitent thief, who sneers against three men who are mocking him. The penitent thief (also referred to as other things such as the good/bad thief ) is at top right; he is portrayed with very pale skin, while being confessed by a horribly ugly monk.

The bottom left corner shows Saint Veronica with the Veil of Veronica. Finally, at the top left is Simon of Cyrene, his face upturned .On the veil of Saint Veronica, there is an image of Christ as well. Christ is positioned in the intersection of two diagonals within the piece, the first diagonal being the wooden cross that Jesus and the impenitent thief, the second being the line that connects Saint Veronica in the bottom left corner and the penitent thief in the upper right corner.The first diagonal shows the expression and position of the penitent thief as overwhelming decision to turn to the Lord.Whereas, the impenitent thief clings to his feelings of hate as Christ's executioners do.

== Religious symbolism ==
The faces of agony depicted in the piece are meant to represent a mob that oppose the ideas of Christ and is imbued with the concept of sin. Jesus’s face, along with his likeness in Saint Veronica’s veil, is meant to show Jesus's emotions in his decision to die for the sins of the people. His expression is especially meant to contrast the faces of the mob because they embody the sins that Christ is giving his life for. Saint Veronica’s melancholy facial expression shows a contrast as well, however, this is in reverence to Christ's actions. The intention of the artist was to depict the inner reality of humanity and Jesus’s solitude in his journey. This is meant to show that Christ is the only person that can forgive humanity for their sins and bring the beauty of humanity to the surface.

== Related works ==
There are two further versions of the subject by Bosch: a previous one from around 1498, now at the Royal Palace of Madrid, and another in the Kunsthistorisches Museum of Vienna from around 1500.

== Sources ==
- Varallo, Franca (2004). Bosch. Milan: Skira.
- Anonymous. Royal Institute for Cultural Heritage Photolibrary, object number 78628, as Hieronymus Bosch, Christus draagt het kruis, circa 1510-1535, 76.7 cm × 83.5 cm (30.2 in × 32.9 in).
- Anonymous. Bildarchiv Foto Marburg, Bildindex der Kunst und Architektur, Object 20390576, as Hieronymus Bosch, Kreuztragung, 74 cm × 81 cm (29 in × 32 in).
- Friedländer, Max J. (1969). Early Netherlandisch Painting. Volume V. Geertgen tot Sint Jans and Jerome Bosch. Leiden: A.W. Slijthof. p. 82.
- Koldeweij, A.M.; Vandenbroeck, P.; Vermet, B. (2001), Jheronimus Bosch. Alle schilderijen en tekeningen, Rotterdam: NAi Uitgevers, p. 79, ISBN 90-5662-219-6
