= Hieronymus Bosch =

Dutch painter (c. 1450–1516)

- Jheronimus Bosch
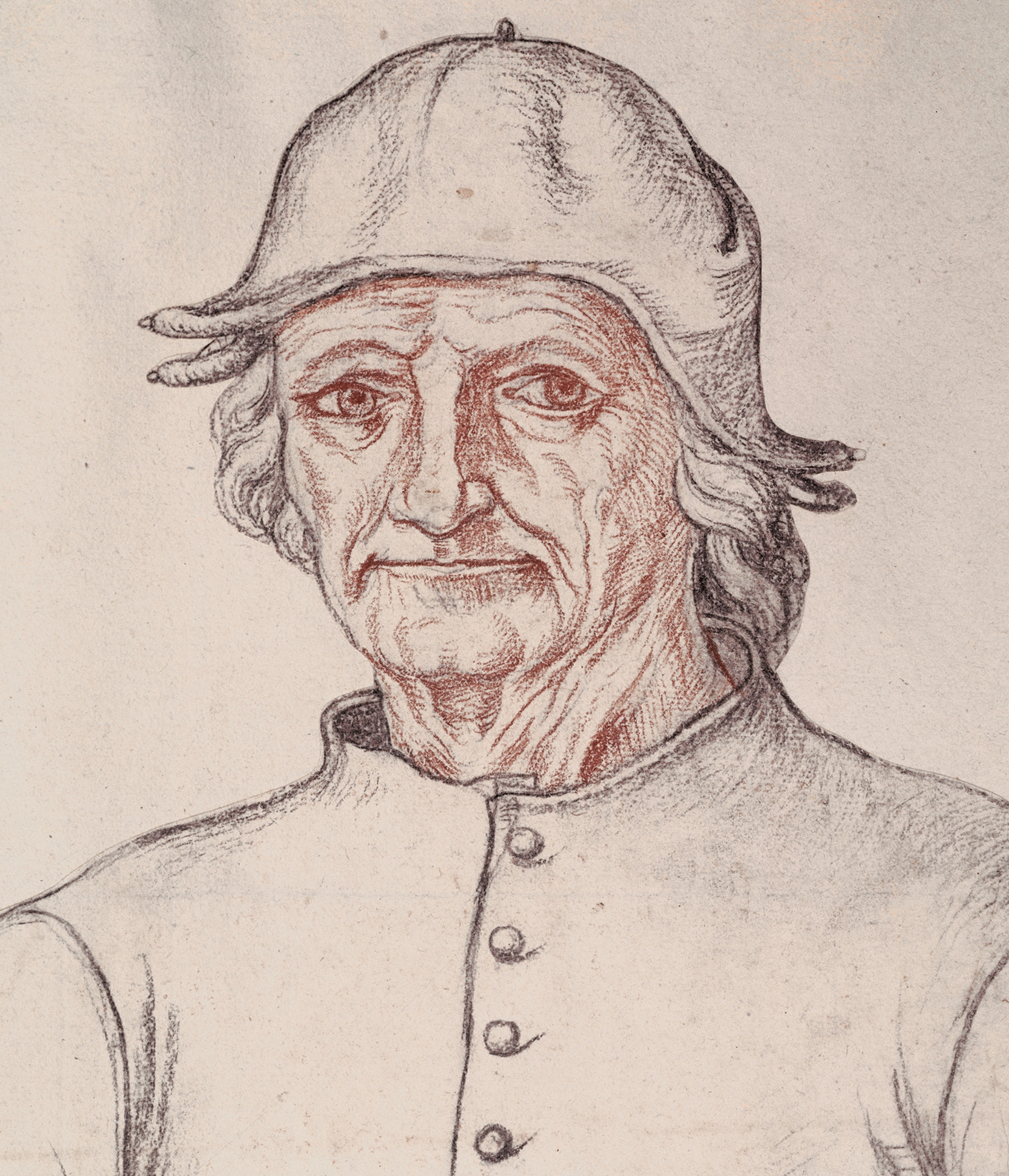
- Portrait of Hieronymus Bosch from the Recueil d'Arras (mid-16th century)
- Born: Jheronimus van Aken c. 1450 's-Hertogenbosch, Duchy of Brabant, Burgundian Netherlands
- Died: Buried on 9 August 1516 (aged 65–66) 's-Hertogenbosch, Duchy of Brabant, Habsburg Netherlands
- Known for: Painting
- Notable work: The Garden of Earthly Delights; The Temptation of St. Anthony
- Movement: Early Netherlandish, Renaissance
- Spouse: Aleid van den Meervenne

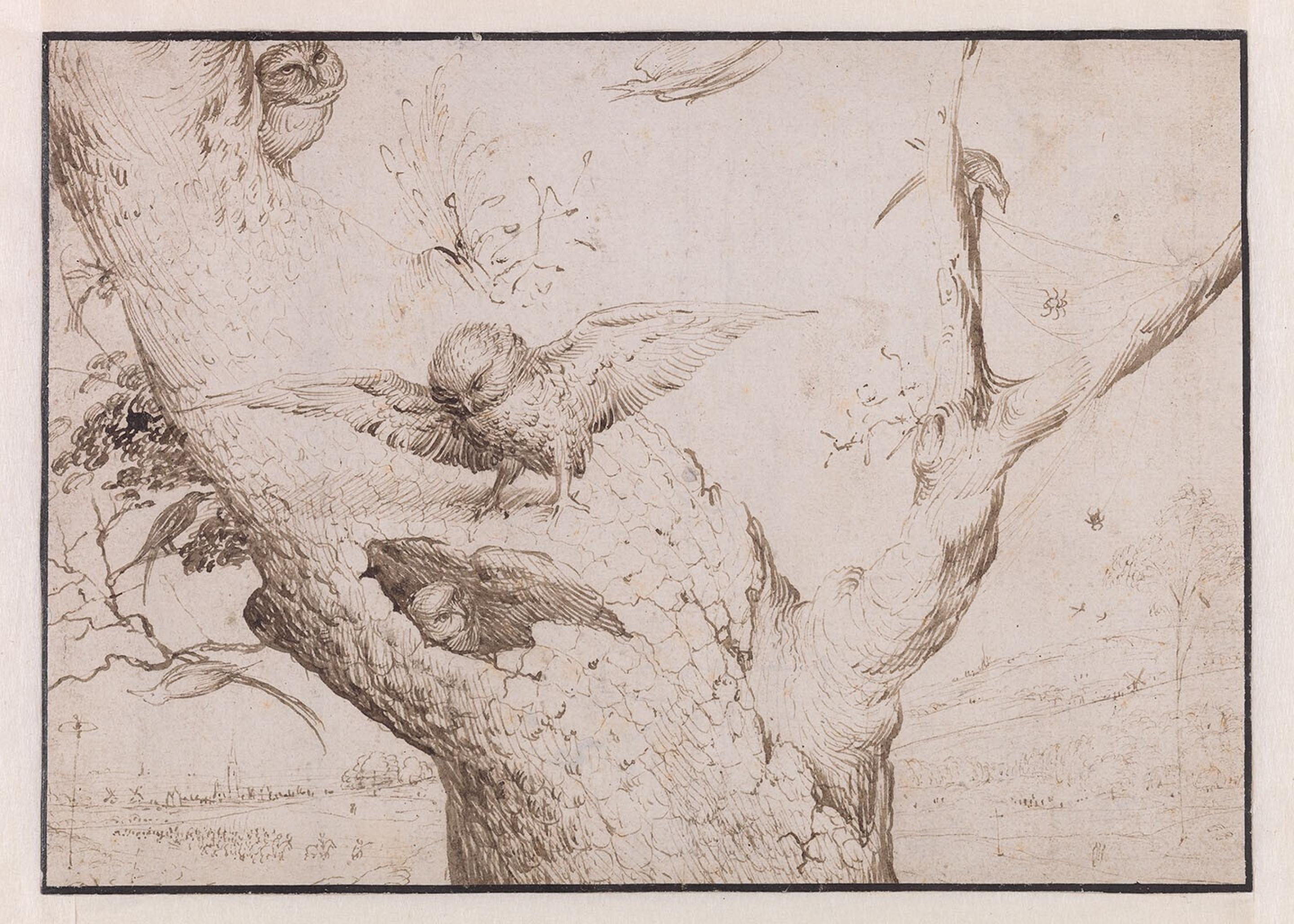
The Owl's Nest, Pen and bistre on paper, 140 × 196 mm. Rotterdam, Museum Boijmans Van Beuningen.

Hieronymus Bosch (/haɪˈrɒnɪməs bɒʃ, bɔːʃ, bɔːs/; Dutch: [ɦijeːˈroːnimʏz ˈbɔs]; (Note: In isolation, Hieronymus is pronounced [ɦijeːˈroːnimʏs].) born Jheronimus van Aken [jeːˈroːnimʏs fɑn ˈaːkə(n)]; (Note: In isolation, van is pronounced [vɑn].) c. 1450 – 9 August 1516) was a Dutch painter from Brabant. He is one of the most notable representatives of the Early Netherlandish painting school. His work, generally oil on oak wood, mainly contains fantastic illustrations of religious concepts and narratives. Within his lifetime, his work was collected in the Netherlands, Austria, and Spain, and widely copied, especially his macabre and nightmarish depictions of hell.

Little is known of Bosch's life, though there are some records. He spent most of it in the town of 's-Hertogenbosch, where he was born in his grandfather's house. The roots of his forefathers are in Nijmegen and Aachen (reflected in his surname, Van Aken). His original, fantastical style cast a wide influence on northern art of the 16th century; Pieter Bruegel the Elder was his best-known follower. Today, Bosch is seen as a highly individualistic artist who offered profound insights into humanity's desires and deepest fears. Attribution of his work has been especially difficult; today only about 25 paintings are confidently identified as his, along with eight drawings. About another half-dozen paintings are confidently attributed to his workshop. His most acclaimed works consist of three triptych altarpieces, particularly The Garden of Earthly Delights.

== Life ==
Hieronymus Bosch's first name was originally Jheronimus (or Joen, respectively the Latin and Middle Dutch form of the name "Jerome"), and he signed a number of his paintings as Jheronimus Bosch.

The surname Bosch derives from his birthplace, 's-Hertogenbosch ('Duke's forest'), which, in the Netherlands, is commonly called "Den Bosch" ('the forest').

Little is known of Bosch's life or training. He left behind no letters or diaries, and known references to him have been taken from brief mentions in the municipal records of 's-Hertogenbosch, and in the account books of the local religious confraternity, the order of the Illustrious Brotherhood of Our Blessed Lady. Nothing is known of his personality, nor of his thoughts on the meaning of his art. Bosch's date of birth has not been determined with certainty. It is estimated at c. 1450, on the basis of a hand-drawn portrait (which may be a self-portrait) made shortly before his death in 1516. The drawing shows the artist at an advanced age, probably in his late sixties.

Bosch lived all his life in and near 's-Hertogenbosch, in the Duchy of Brabant. His grandfather Jan van Aken (died 1454) was a painter and is first mentioned in the records in 1430. Jan had five sons, four of whom were also painters. Bosch's father, Anthonius van Aken (died c. 1478), acted as artistic adviser to the Illustrious Brotherhood of Our Blessed Lady. It is generally assumed that either Bosch's father or one of his uncles taught him to paint, but none of their works survive. Bosch first appears in the municipal record on 5 April 1474, when he is named along with two brothers and a sister.

's-Hertogenbosch was a flourishing city in 15th-century Brabant, in the south of the present-day Netherlands, which at the time was part of the Burgundian Netherlands. It was originally under the control of the Duchy of Brabant before being passed through marriage to the Habsburgs. In 1463, 4,000 houses in the town were destroyed by a catastrophic fire, which the (approximately) thirteen-year-old Bosch presumably witnessed. He became a popular painter in his lifetime and often received commissions from abroad. In 1486/7, he joined the highly respected Brotherhood of Our Lady, a devotional confraternity of some 40 influential citizens of 's-Hertogenbosch, and 7,000 "outer-members" from around Europe.

Sometime between 1479 and 1481, Bosch married Aleid Goyaerts van den Meervenne, who was a few years his senior. The couple moved to the nearby town of Oirschot, where Aleid had inherited a house and land from her wealthy family. An entry in the accounts of the Brotherhood of Our Lady records Bosch's death in 1516. A memorial funeral mass was held in the church of Saint John on 9 August of that year.

== Works ==
The Crucifixion of St Wilgefortis is attributed to Bosch's middle period, c. 1497.

Bosch produced at least sixteen triptychs: of them, eight survive fully intact with another five surviving in fragments. Bosch's works are generally organised into three periods of his life dealing with the early works (c. 1470–1485), the middle period (c. 1485–1500), and the late period (c. 1500 until his death). According to Stefan Fischer, thirteen of Bosch's surviving paintings were completed in the late period, with seven attributed to his middle period. Bosch's early period is studied in terms of his workshop activity and possibly some of his drawings. Indeed, he taught pupils in the workshop, who were influenced by him. The recent dendrochronological investigation of the oak panels by the scientists at the Bosch Research and Conservation Project led to a more precise dating of the majority of Bosch's paintings.

Bosch sometimes painted in a comparatively sketchy manner, contrasting with the traditional Early Netherlandish style of painting in which the smooth surface—achieved by the application of multiple transparent glazes—conceals the brushwork. His paintings with their rough surfaces, so-called impasto painting, differed from the tradition of the great Netherlandish painters of the end of the 15th and the beginning of the 16th centuries, who wished to hide the work done and thus suggest their paintings as more nearly divine creations.

Bosch did not date his paintings, but—unusually for the time—seems to have signed several of them, although some signatures purporting to be his are certainly not. About twenty-five paintings remain today that can be attributed to him. In the late 16th century, Philip II of Spain acquired many of Bosch's paintings. As a result, the Prado Museum in Madrid now owns the Adoration of the Magi, The Garden of Earthly Delights, the tabletop painting of The Seven Deadly Sins and the Four Last Things and The Haywain Triptych.

=== Painting materials ===
Bosch painted his works mostly on oak panels using oil as a medium. Bosch's palette was rather limited and contained the usual pigments of his time. He mostly used azurite for blue skies and distant landscapes, green copper-based glazes and paints consisting of malachite or verdigris for foliage and foreground landscapes, and lead-tin-yellow, ochres and red lake (carmine or madder lake) for his figures.

=== The Garden of Earthly Delights ===
The Garden of Earthly Delights in the Museo del Prado in Madrid, c. 1495–1505, attributed to Bosch

One of his most famous triptychs is The Garden of Earthly Delights (c. 1495–1505) whose outer panels are intended to bracket the main central panel between the Garden of Eden depicted on the left panel and the Last Judgment depicted on the right panel. It is attributed by Fischer as a transitional painting rendered by Bosch between his middle period and his late period. In the left-hand panel God presents Eve to Adam. Innovatively, God is given a youthful appearance. The figures are set in a landscape populated by exotic animals and unusual semi-organic hut-shaped forms. The central panel is a broad panorama teeming with nude figures engaged in innocent, self-absorbed joy, as well as fantastical compound animals, oversized fruit, and hybrid stone formations.

The right panel presents a hellscape: a world in which humankind has succumbed to the temptations of evil and is reaping eternal damnation. Set at night, the panel features cold colours, tortured figures, and frozen waterways. The nakedness of the human figures has lost any eroticism suggested in the central panel. Large explosions in the background throw light through the city gate and spill onto the water in the panel's midground.

=== Triptych of the Temptation of St. Anthony ===
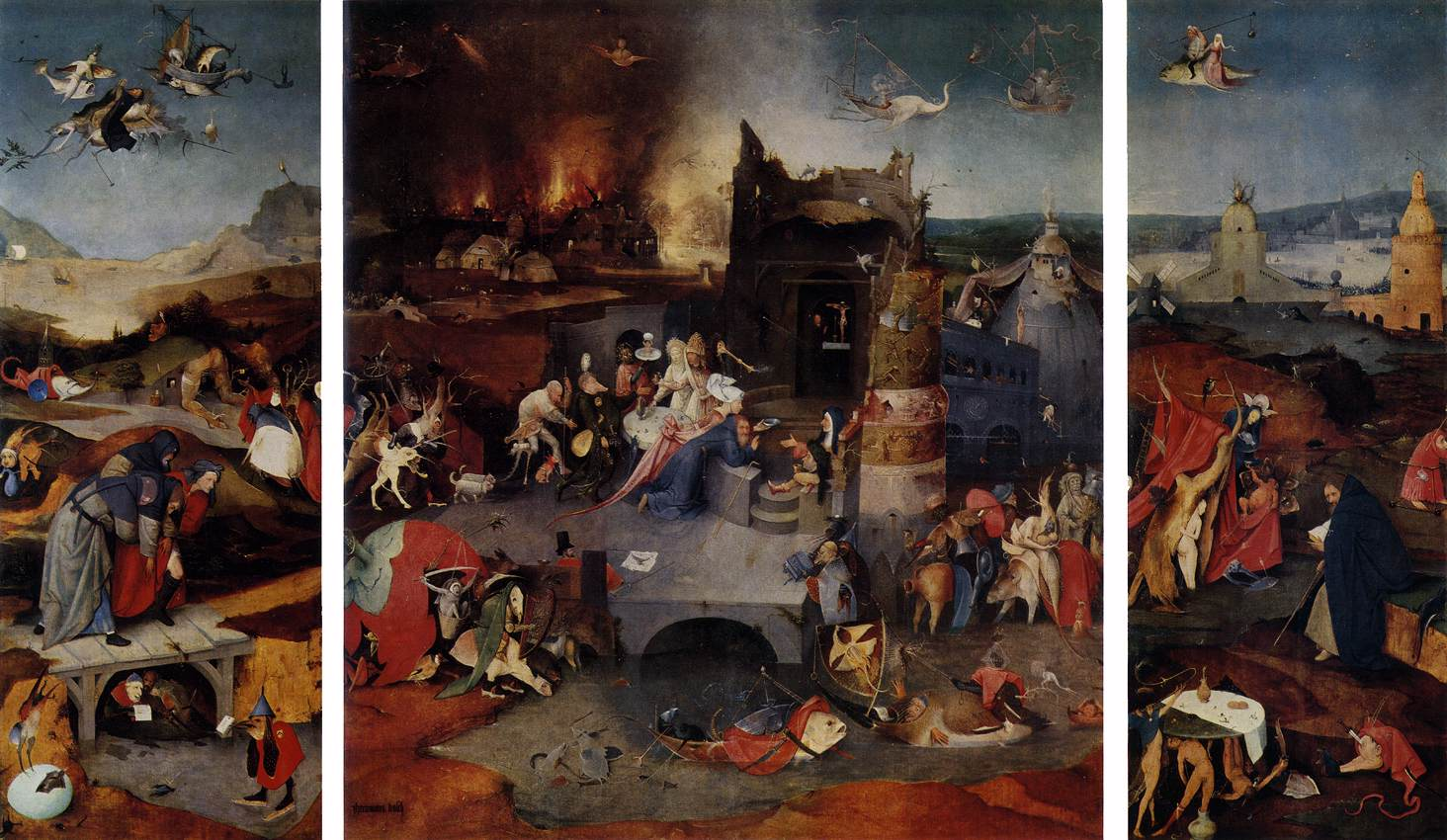
Triptych of the Temptation of St Anthony (1501 C.) in the National Museum of Ancient Art, Lisbon, Portugal

Bosch's Temptation of St. Anthony triptych is one of his most famous works, along with The Garden of Earthly Delights. It shows Saint Anthony being tempted or assailed in the desert by demons, whose temptations he resisted. Strictly speaking, there are at least two different episodes deriving from Athanasius's Life of St. Anthony, as well as later versions of the life, which may be depicted.

The most common is the temptation by seductive women, sometimes in conjunction with demonic forms. The Martin Schongauer composition (copied, according to Vasari, by Michelangelo) probably shows a later episode where St Anthony, normally flown about the desert and supported by angels, was ambushed and attacked in mid-air by devils. Anasthasius describes another episode where the saint was attacked on the ground.

== Interpretation ==
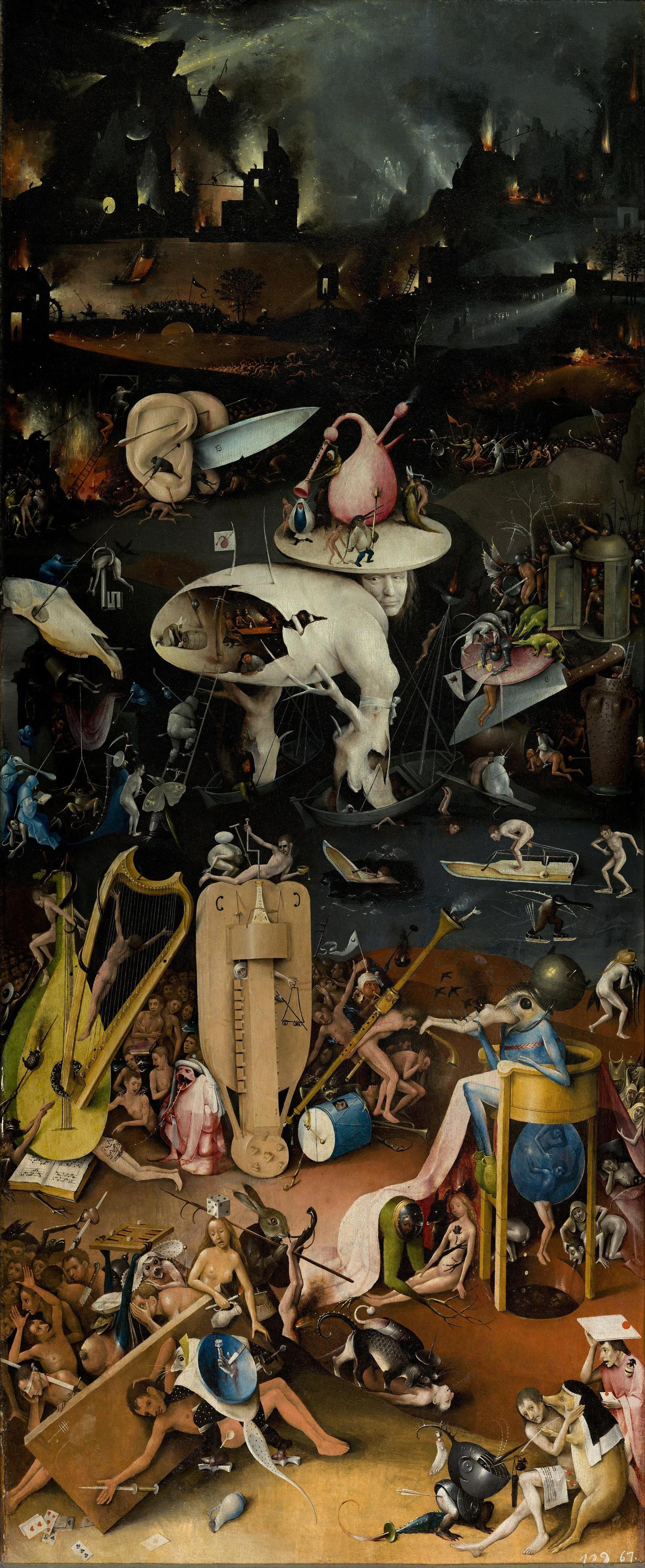
The hell panel from The Garden of Earthly Delights. It is alleged that Bosch's self-portrait is in the upper centre at right under the "table".

In the 20th century, when changing artistic tastes made artists like Bosch more palatable to the European imagination, it was sometimes argued that Bosch's art was inspired by heretical points of view (e.g., the ideas of the Cathars and/or putative Adamites or Brethren of the Free Spirit) as well as by obscure hermetic practices. Erasmus had been educated at one of the houses of the Brethren of the Common Life in 's-Hertogenbosch, and the town was religiously progressive, some writers have found it unsurprising that strong parallels exist between the caustic writing of Erasmus and the often bold painting of Bosch.

Others, following a strain of Bosch-interpretation datable already to the 16th century, continued to think his work was created merely to titillate and amuse, much like the "grotteschi" of the Italian Renaissance. While the art of the older masters was based in the physical world of everyday experience, Bosch confronts his viewer with, in the words of the art historian Walter Gibson, "a world of dreams [and] nightmares in which forms seem to flicker and change before our eyes". In one of the first known accounts of Bosch's paintings, in 1560 the Spaniard Felipe de Guevara wrote that Bosch was regarded merely as "the inventor of monsters and chimeras". In the early 17th century, the artist-biographer Karel van Mander described Bosch's work as comprising "wondrous and strange fantasies"; however, he concluded that the paintings are "often less pleasant than gruesome to look at".

In recent decades, scholars have come to view Bosch's vision as less fantastic, and accepted that his art reflects the orthodox religious belief systems of his age. His depictions of sinful humanity and his conceptions of heaven and hell are now seen as consistent with those of late medieval didactic literature and sermons. Most writers attach a more profound significance to his paintings than had previously been supposed, and attempt to interpret them in terms of a late medieval morality. It is generally accepted that Bosch's art was created to teach specific moral and spiritual truths in the manner of other Northern Renaissance figures, such as the poet Robert Henryson, and that the images rendered have precise and premeditated significance. According to Dirk Bax, Bosch's paintings often represent visual translations of verbal metaphors and puns drawn from both biblical and folkloric sources.

Art historians have pointed to ambiguities in Bosch's work, emphasising ironic tendencies, for example in The Garden of Earthly Delights, both in the central panel (delights), and the right panel (hell). They theorise that the irony offers the option of detachment, both from the real world and from the painted fantasy world, thus appealing to both conservative and progressive viewers. According to Joseph Koerner, some of the cryptic qualities of the artist's work are due to his special focus on social, political, and spiritual enemies, whose symbolism is, by nature, disguised because it is intended to shield the artist from criticism and harm.

== Debates on attribution ==
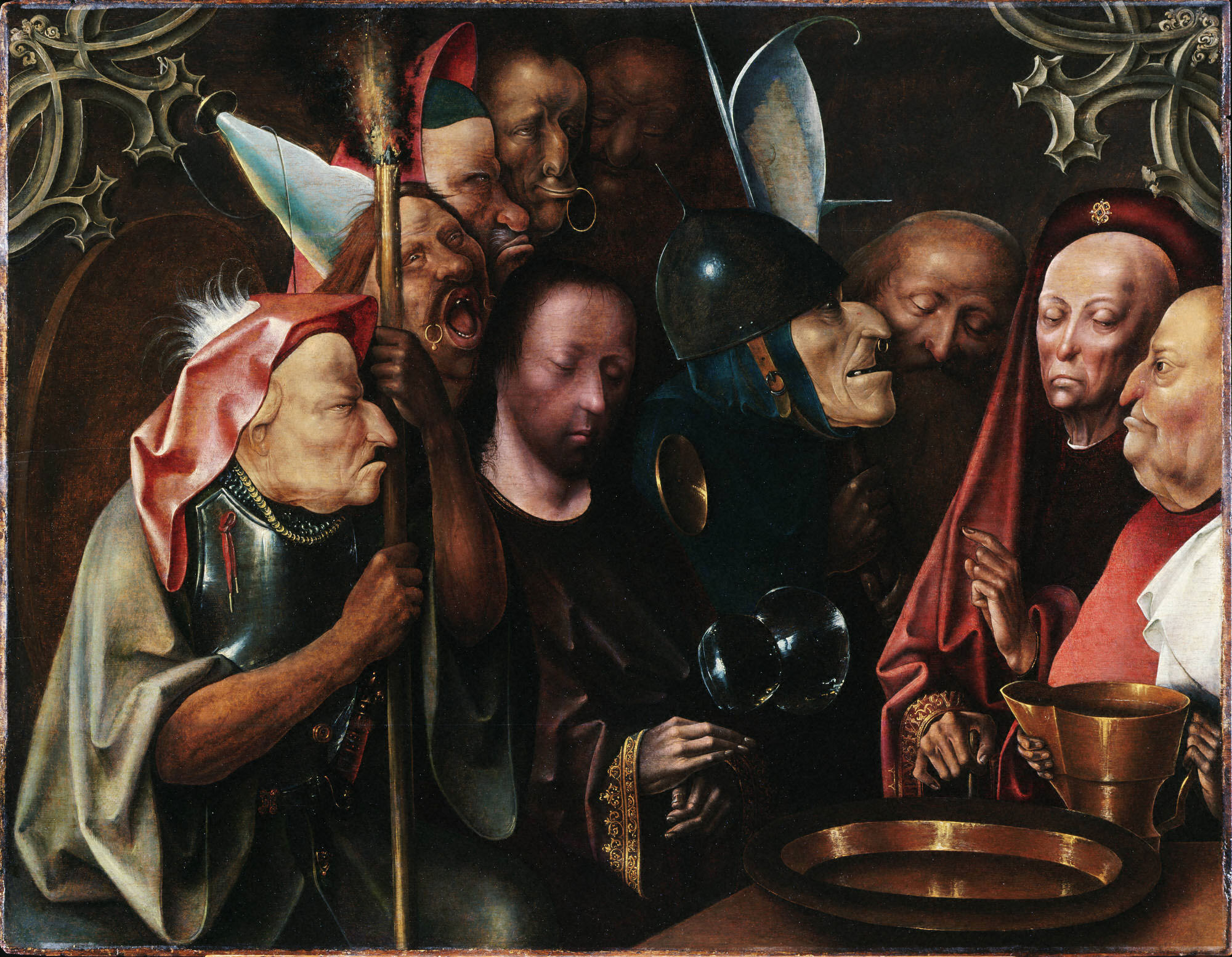
Christ Before Pilate, c. 1520, one of the paintings with disputed attribution, in the Princeton University Art Museum which would date from Bosch's late period of painting

The exact number of Bosch's surviving works has been a subject of considerable debate. His signature can be seen on only seven of his surviving paintings, and there is considerable doubt that many of the paintings once ascribed to him were actually from his hand. It is known that from the early 16th century onward, numerous copies and variations of his paintings began to circulate. In addition, his style was highly influential, and was widely imitated by his numerous followers.

Over the years, scholars have attributed to him fewer and fewer of the works once thought to be his. This is partly a result of technological advances such as infrared reflectography, which enable researchers to examine a painting's underdrawing. Art historians of the early and mid-20th century, such as Tolnay and Baldass, identified between thirty and fifty paintings that they believed to be by Bosch's hand. A later monograph by Gerd Unverfehrt (1980) attributed twenty-five paintings and 14 drawings to him.

In early 2016, The Temptation of St. Anthony, a small panel in the Nelson-Atkins Museum of Art in Kansas City, Missouri, long attributed to the workshop of Hieronymus Bosch, was credited to the painter himself after intensive forensic study by the Bosch Research and Conservation Project. The BRCP has also questioned whether two well-known paintings traditionally accepted to be by Bosch, The Seven Deadly Sins in the Prado and Christ Carrying the Cross in the Museum of Fine Arts, Ghent should instead be credited to the artist's workshop rather than to the painter's own hand.

== See also ==
- List of paintings by Hieronymus Bosch
- List of drawings by Hieronymus Bosch

== Bibliography ==
- Bax, Dirk. Ontcijfering van Jeroen Bosch. Den Haag: Staats-drukkerij-en Uitgeverijbedrijf, 1949.
- Boulboullé, Guido. "Groteske Angst. Die Höllenphantasien des Hieronymus Bosch". In: Auffarth, Christoph and Kerth, Sonja (Eds): Glaubensstreit und Gelächter: Reformation und Lachkultur im Mittelalter und in der Frühen Neuzeit. Berlin: LIT Verlag, 2008. 55–78.
- Dijck, Godfried Christiaan Maria van. Op zoek naar Jheronimus van Aken alias Bosch. De feiten. Familie, vrienden en opdrachtgevers. Zaltbommel: Europese Bibliotheek, 2001. ISBN 90-288-2687-4
- Fischer, Stefan. Hieronymus Bosch. The Complete Works. Köln: Taschen, 2016 ISBN 978-3836526296
- Fraenger, Wilhelm. Hieronymus Bosch. Dresden: Verlag der Kunst, 1975.
  - Le royaume millénaire de Jérôme Bosch (French transl. by Roger Lewinter, Paris: Ivrea, 1993).
- Gibson, Walter. Hieronymus Bosch. New York: Thames and Hudson, 1973. ISBN 0-500-20134-X
- Jacobs, Lynn. "The Triptychs of Hieronymus Bosch". The Sixteenth Century Journal, Volume 31, No. 4, 2000. 1009–1041
- Koerner, Joseph Leo. Bosch and Bruegel: From Enemy Painting to Everyday Life. Princeton University Press, 2016. ISBN 9780691172286
- Koldeweij, Jos & Vermet, Bernard & van Kooij, Barbera. Hieronymus Bosch. New Insights Into His Life and Work. Rotterdam: NAi Publishers, 2001. ISBN 90-5662-214-5
- Malizia, Enrico. Hieronymus Bosch. Insigne pittore nel crepuscolo del medio evo. Stregoneria, magia, alchimia, simbolismo. Roma: Youcanprint Ed., 2015. ISBN 978-88-91171-74-0
- Marijnissen, Roger. Hiëronymus Bosch. Het volledige oeuvre. Haarlem: Gottmer/Brecht, 1987. ISBN 90-230-0651-8
- Pokorny, Erwin. "Hieronymus Bosch und das Paradies der Wollust". In: Frühneuzeit-Info, Jg. 21, Heft 1+2 ("Sonderband: Die Sieben Todsünden in der Frühen Neuzeit"), 2010. 22–34.
- Strickland, Debra Higgs. The Epiphany of Hieronymys Bosch. Imagining Antichrist and Others from the Middle Ages to the Reformation (Studies in Medieval and Early Renaissance Art History), Turnhout: Harvey Miller, 2016, ISBN 978-1-909400-55-9
