= Last Judgment (disambiguation) =

The Last Judgment is part of the eschatology of the Abrahamic religions and in the Frashokereti of Zoroastrianism.

Last Judgment or Last Judgement may also refer to a variety of creative works, such as, chronologically:

== Art ==
- Doom painting, a general term for murals, usually on the west wall of a church
- The Last Judgment (Fra Angelico, Florence), a painting by Fra Angelico
- Crucifixion and Last Judgement diptych, a diptych by Jan van Eyck
- Last Judgement (Lochner), a polyptych by Stefan Lochner
- The Last Judgment (Rogier van der Weyden), a triptych by Rogier van der Weyden
- The Last Judgment (Memling), a 1471 triptych attributed to Hans Memling
- The Last Judgment (Bosch, Vienna), a triptych by Hieronymus Bosch
- The Last Judgment (Bosch, Bruges), a triptych attributed to Hieronymus Bosch and/or his workshop
- Last Judgement (Fra Bartolomeo), a fresco by Fra Bartolomeo and Mariotto Albertinelli
- The Last Judgment (Bosch, Munich), a fragment of a triptych by a follower of Hieronymus Bosch
- The Last Judgement (Biberach Master), a fragment of a carved limewood altarpiece attributed to the Biberach Master
- The Last Judgment (Michelangelo), a fresco by Michelangelo in the Sistine Chapel
- Last Judgement (Venusti), a painting by Marcello Venusti after Michelangelo's fresco
- The Last Judgement Triptych (Klontzas), a triptych by Georgios Klontzas
- The Last Judgement (Vasari and Zuccari), a fresco inside the dome of Florence Cathedral
- The Last Judgment (Klontzas), an icon by Georgios Klontzas
- The Great Last Judgement (Rubens), a painting by Peter Paul Rubens
- The Last Judgment (Kavertzas), a painting by Francheskos Kavertzas
- The Last Judgment (Moskos), a painting by Leos Moskos
- A Vision of the Last Judgement, an 1810 painting by William Blake
- The Last Judgement (Martin paintings), a triptych by John Martin

== Film ==
- The Last Judgment (1945 film), a 1945 French drama film
- The Last Judgment (1961 film), an Italian-language comedy film

== Music ==
- The Last Judgement Naji Hakim
- The Last Judgement Louis Spohr

== Television ==
- "Last Judgement", Wycliffe series 3, episode 7 (1996)
- "The Last Judgment", Have Gun – Will Travel season 3, episode 25 (1961)

== See also ==
- Final Judgment (disambiguation)
