= Pieterskerk, Leiden =

Gothic Dutch Protestant church in Leiden, Netherlands

Coordinates: 52°9′27″N 4°29′16″E

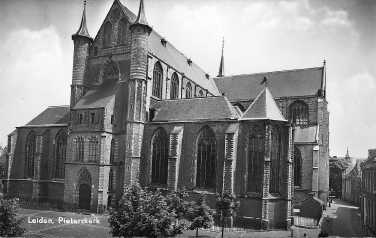
Old postcard of the church

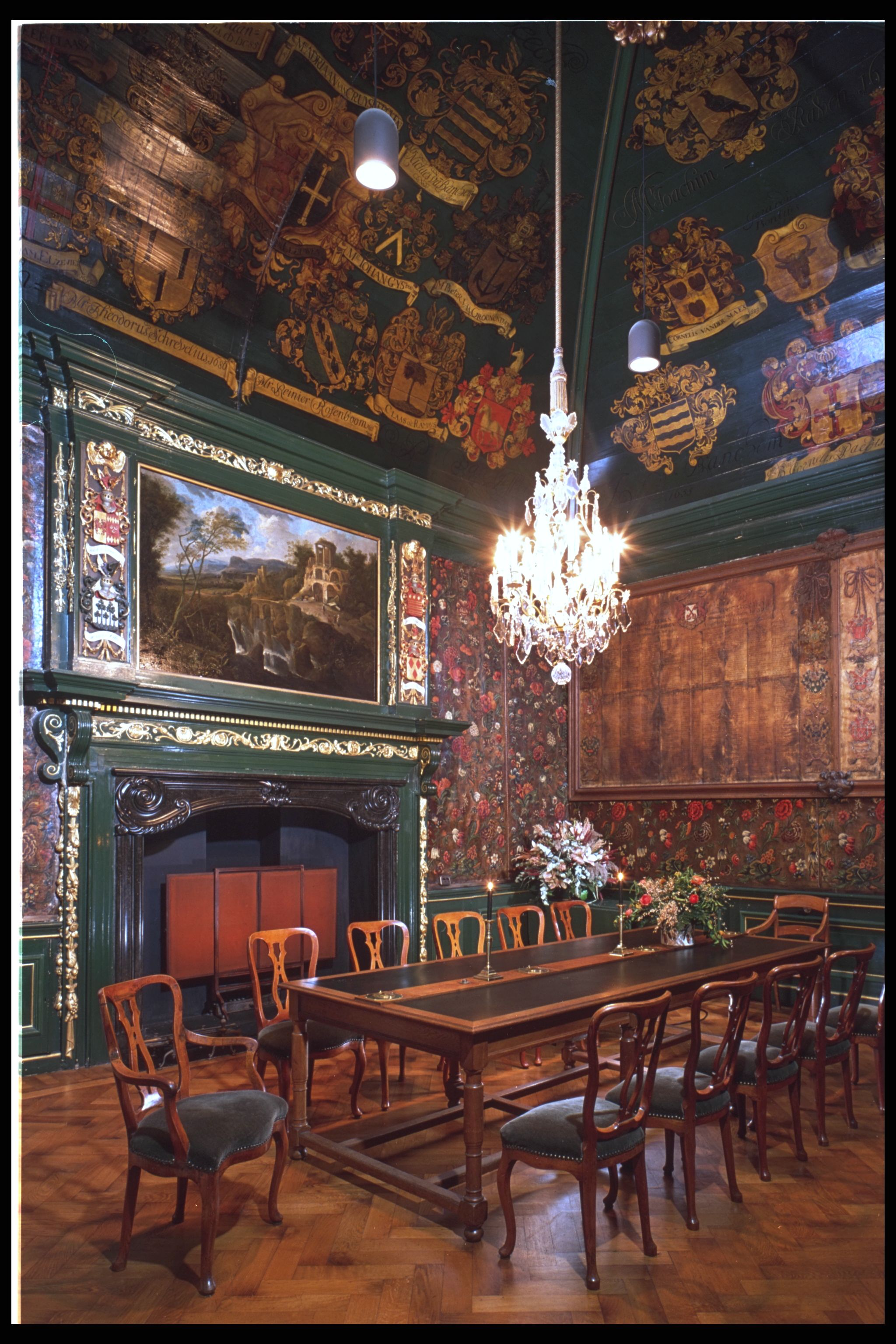
Church Trustees room

The Pieterskerk is a late-Gothic Dutch Protestant church in Leiden dedicated to Saint Peter. It is known today as the church of the Pilgrim Fathers, where the pastor John Robinson was buried. It is also the burial place of the scientist Willebrord Snellius.

== History ==
In around 1100 the site held the county chapel of the counts of Holland, rebuilt in 1121. The present building took approximately 180 years to build, starting in 1390. Famous Leiden dignitaries are buried there, including the painter Jan Steen and the Leiden professor Herman Boerhaave. The beautiful stained-glass windows already took a terrible blow during the Beeldenstorm, but were completely destroyed a couple of centuries later, in the gunpowder explosion of 12 January 1807. The windows were boarded up, and it wasn't until 1880 that a large-scale restoration took place.

The Pieterskerk used to have a church tower, the Westtoren (west tower) from 1290 on. It was nicknamed "Coningh der Zee" (king of the sea), and was completed in stages, eventually reaching 110 metres (including the 35-metre-tall wooden spire). It collapsed in the night of 5 March 1512. The tower was not restored and the church remains towerless.

Not only the stained glass windows were vandalised during the Beeldenstorm, many other beautiful statues and paintings were made victim of the Reformation. The internationally renowned painting Het Laatste Oordeel by Lucas van Leyden was barely saved by mayor Van Swanenburg.

On 7 July 1572 the church was closed for services. It reopened on 5 October of the same year for the first Protestant service. After this date the building of the church can be considered completed. In following centuries small homes were built against the sides of the church. They are still there today.

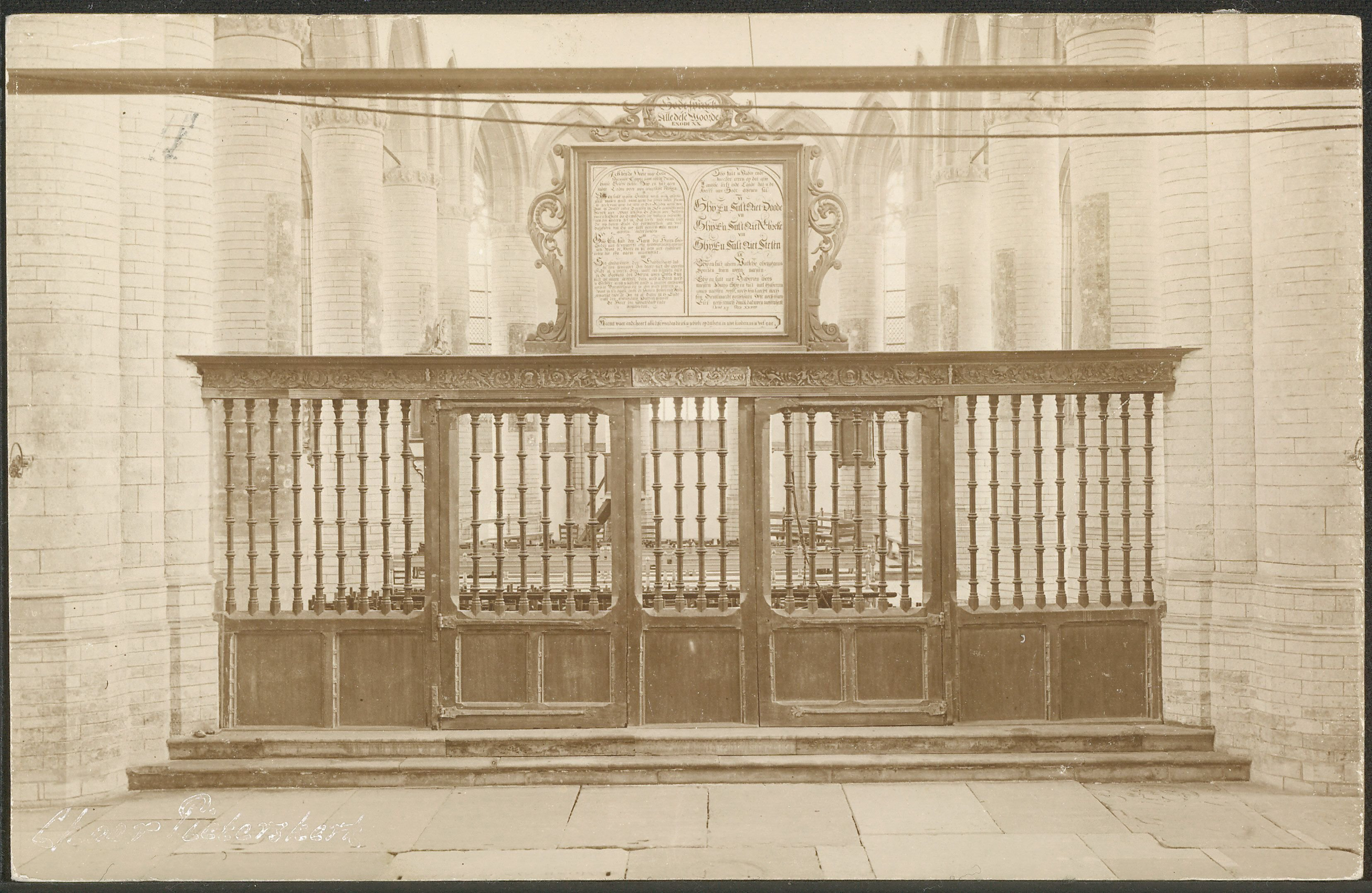
View of the screen separating choir and church.

The building was deconsecrated in 1971 and since 1975 has been managed by a foundation and rented for a wide variety of events. Since 2001, with 50% government funding, a long-term restoration project started that ran until 2010. Discoveries made during this and earlier restorations were put on permanent display in the church. A mummy is also on display, that the foundation has chosen not to subject to scientific scrutiny. Though the windows have been lost, the various grave monuments by prominent Leiden sculptors can still be seen. The building is open to the public.

Among many musical performances in the church every year, there was a concert by the choral group Libera in 2007.

== Burials ==
Before 1811 many prominent people were buried in the Pieterskerk, such as the Dutch theologian Jacobus Arminius (known for Arminianism), Herman Boerhaave, Jan Steen, the botanist Rembert Dodoens, Johannes de Laet, and John Robinson, pastor of the "Pilgrim Fathers".

For a listing, see the category Burials at the Pieterskerk, Leiden.

== Gallery ==
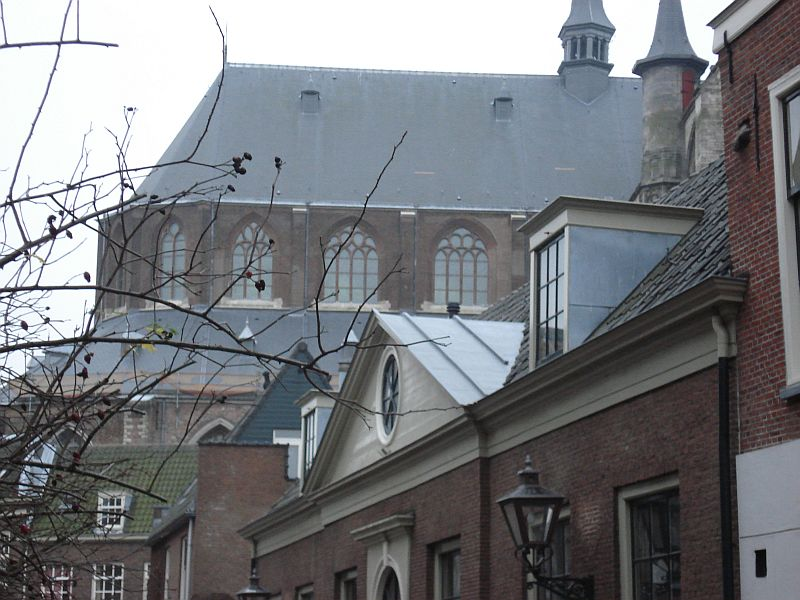
The Pieterskerk from a side street.

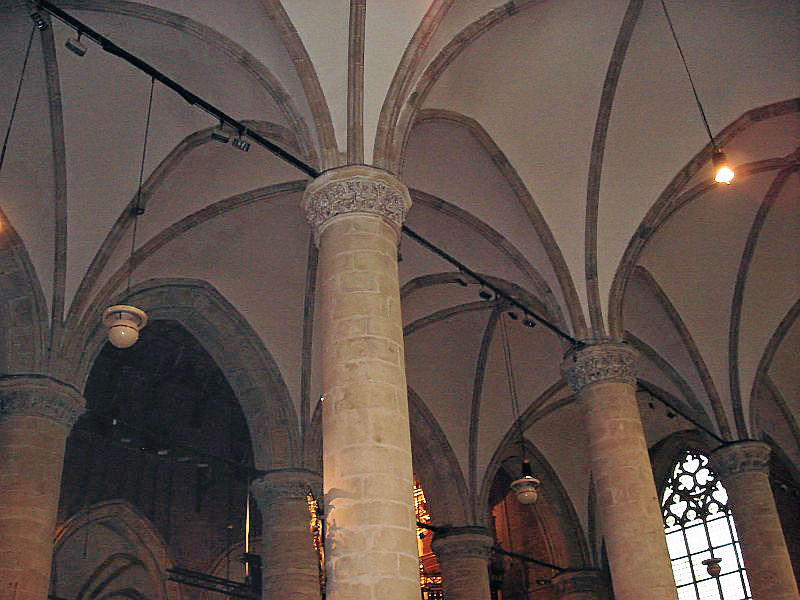
The vaulted ceiling.

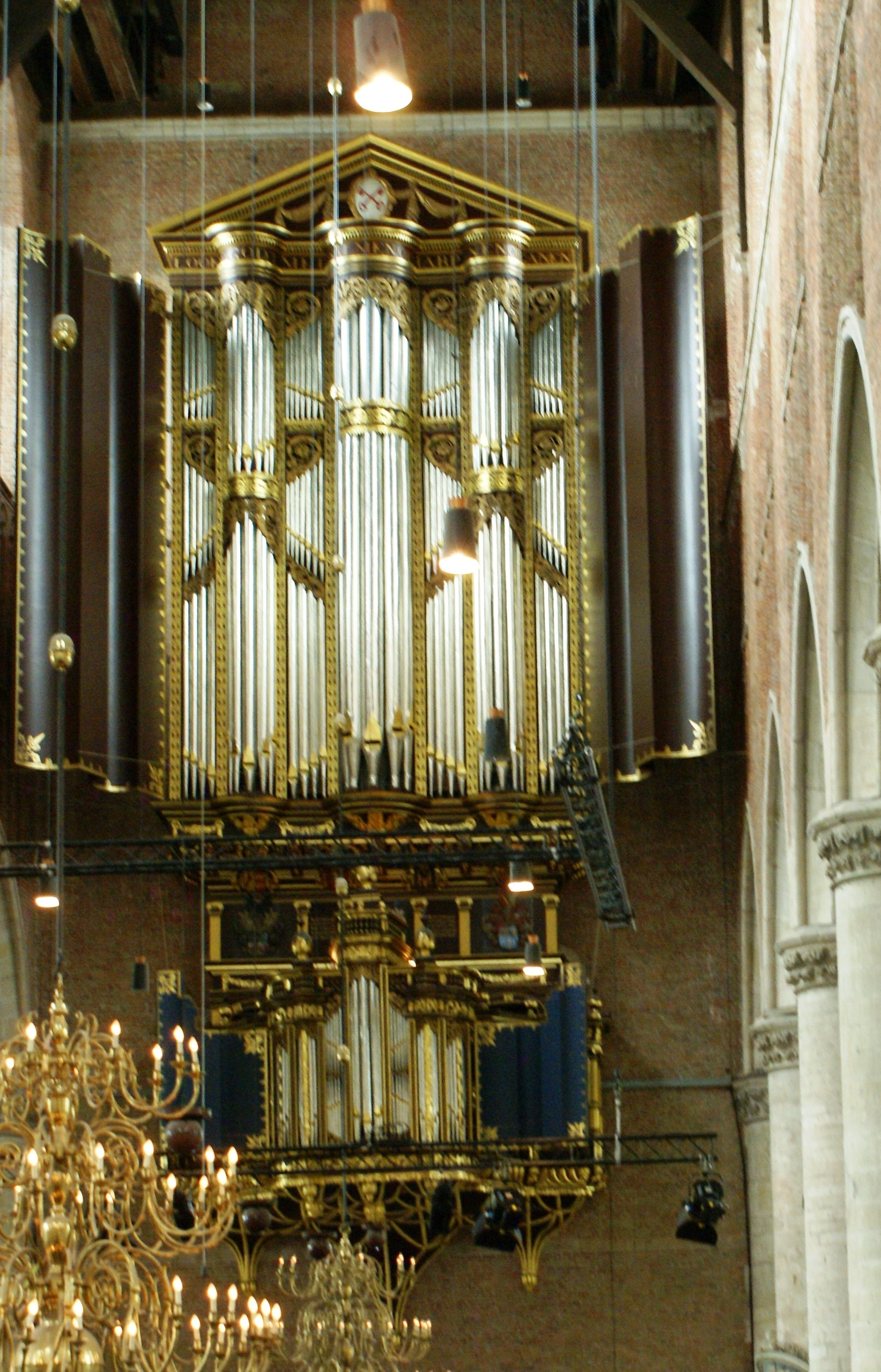
Van Hagerbeer organ (1643)

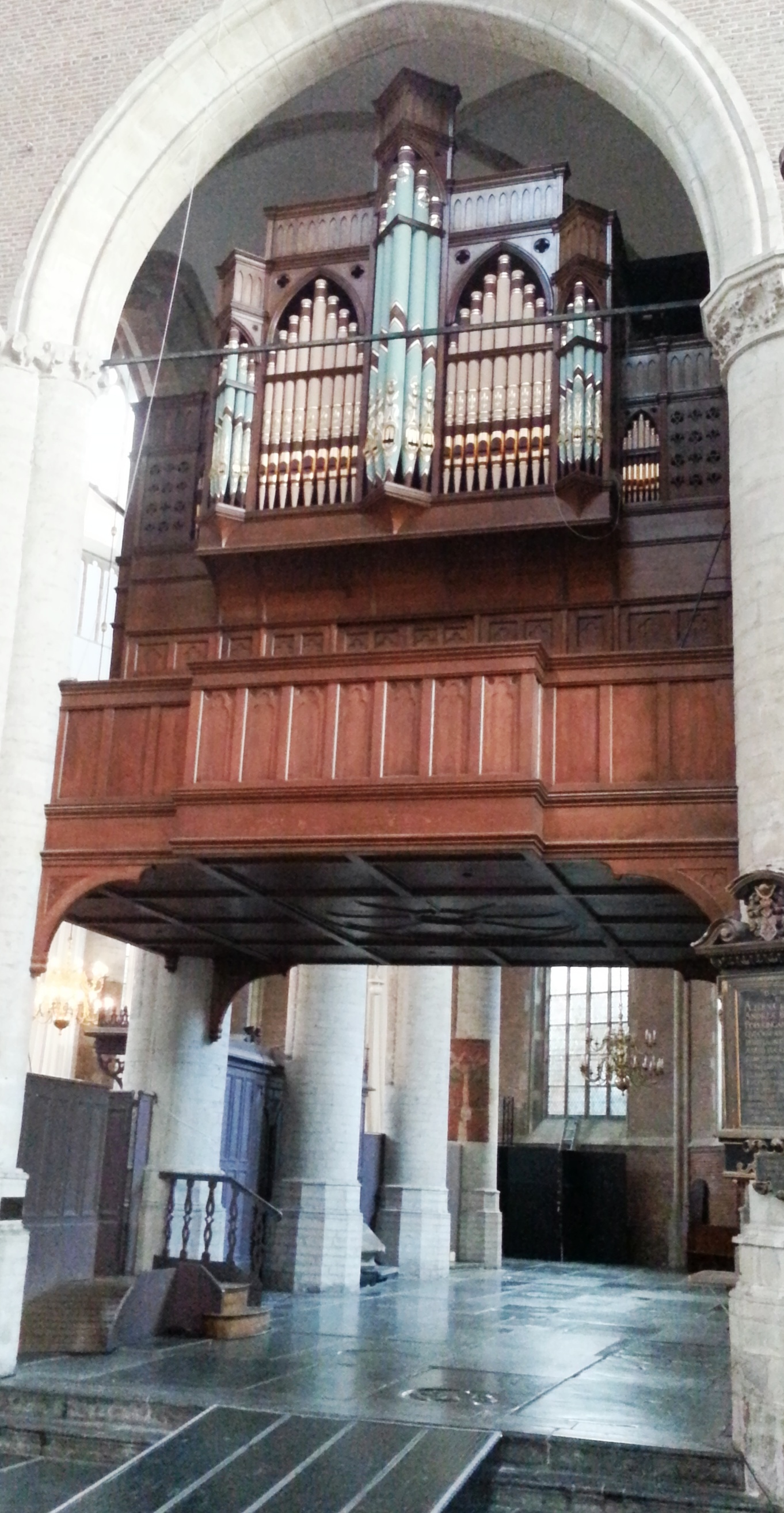
Thomas Hill Organ (1883)

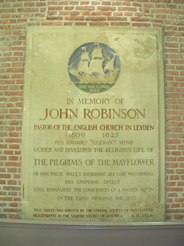
Historical marker to the memory of Pastor John Robinson near where he is buried.
