= Final Judgment (disambiguation) =

Final Judgment is another name for Last Judgment, an event in the eschatology of several religions. It may also refer to an appealable final legal judgment.

Final Judgment or Final Judgement may also refer to a variety of creative works, such as, chronologically:

== Film ==
- The Final Judgment, a 1915 silent film
- Final Judgment (1992 film), directed by Louis Morneau

== Literature ==
- Final Judgment: The Missing Link in the JFK Assassination Conspiracy, a 1993 expose by Michael Collins Piper
- The Final Judgment, a 1995 novel by Richard North Patterson
- Final Judgment, a 2012 novel attributed to Don Pendleton; the 404th installment in The Executioner series
- Final Judgment, a 2012 novel by Joel Goldman
- Final Judgment (novel), a 2016 legal thriller novel by Marcia Clark

== Television ==
=== Episodes ===
- "Bar Wars V: The Final Judgment", Cheers season 10, episode 7 (1991)
- "Final Judgment", Barnaby Jones season 6, episodes 18–19 (1978)
- "Final Judgment", Mutant X season 2, episode 17 (2003)
- "Final Judgment", Renegade season 1, episode 3 (1992)
- "Final Judgment", The Practice season 7, episode 1st (2003)
- "Final Judgement", Picket Fences season 3, episode 19 (1995)
- "The Final Judgment", The Ryuo's Work Is Never Done! episode 12 (2018)
- "The Final Judgement", Cardcaptor Sakura season 2, episode 11 (1999)
- "The Final Judgement", Crime Diaries: Night Out episode 8 (2019)
- "The Final Judgement", Legally Blind episode 93 (2017)
- "The Final Judgement of Beavis", Beavis and Butt-Head season 4, episode 13 (1994)

=== Shows ===
- StarStruck: The Final Judgment, a 2019 two-hour special conclusion of the seventh season of the Philippine reality talent competition show
- Vettai 3: The Final Judgment (2014–2015), third season of the Singaporean police procedural TV series Vettai

== See also ==
- Last Judgment (disambiguation)
- Final judgment in the Ayodhya dispute, a 2019 Supreme Court of India verdict
