= Heede =

Heede may refer to:

== People ==
- Frederic Van den Heede (born 1974), Belgian paralympic athlete
- Jean-Luc Van Den Heede (born 1945), French sailor
- Sylvia Vanden Heede (born 1961), Belgian author of children's books
- Vigor van Heede (1661–1708), Flemish painter

== Places ==
- Heede, Lower Saxony, Germany
- Heede, Schleswig-Holstein, Germany
