= Groeningemuseum =

Museum in Bruges, Belgium

Coordinates: 51°12′19″N 3°13′36″E

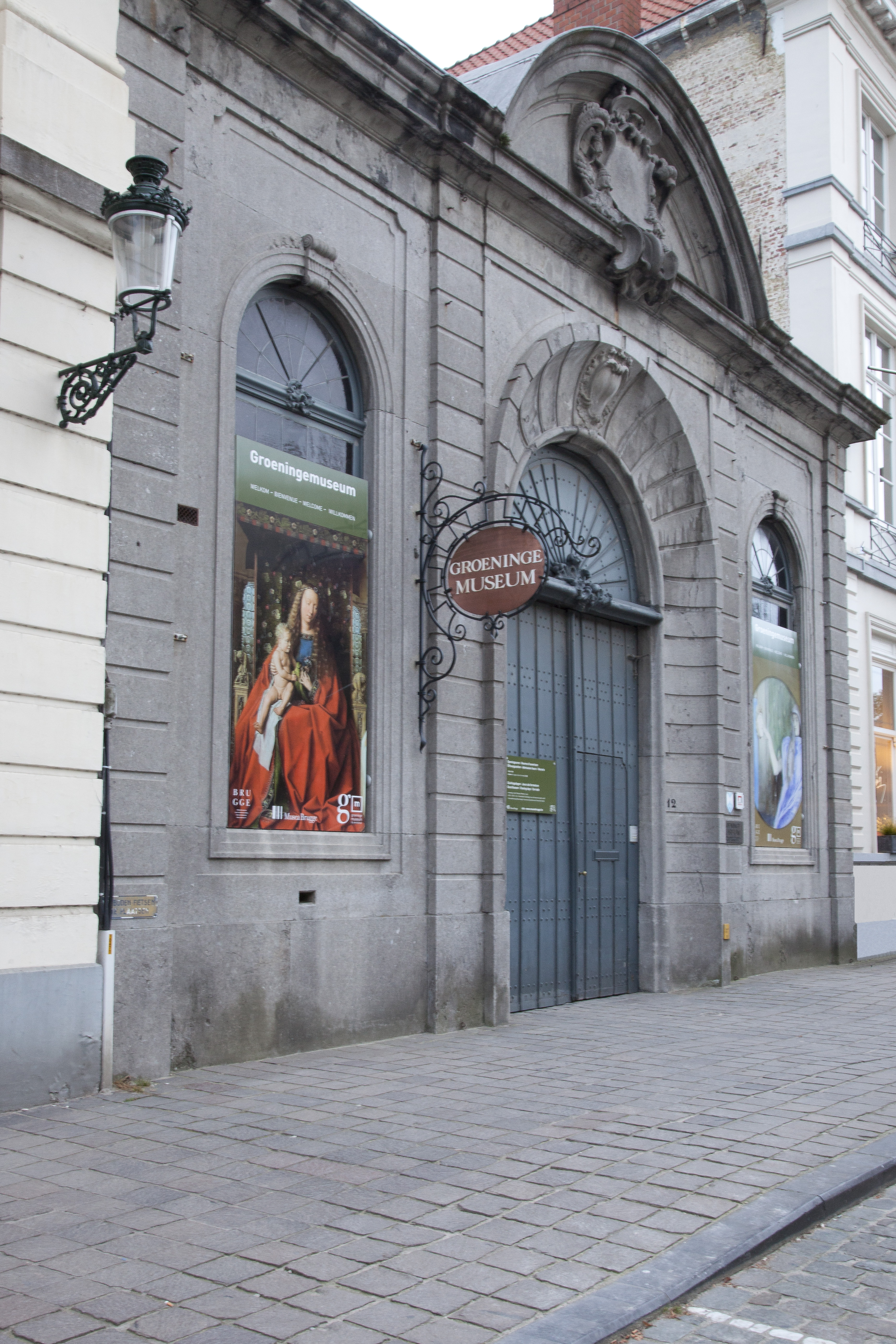
The Groeningemuseum, Dijver 12, Bruges

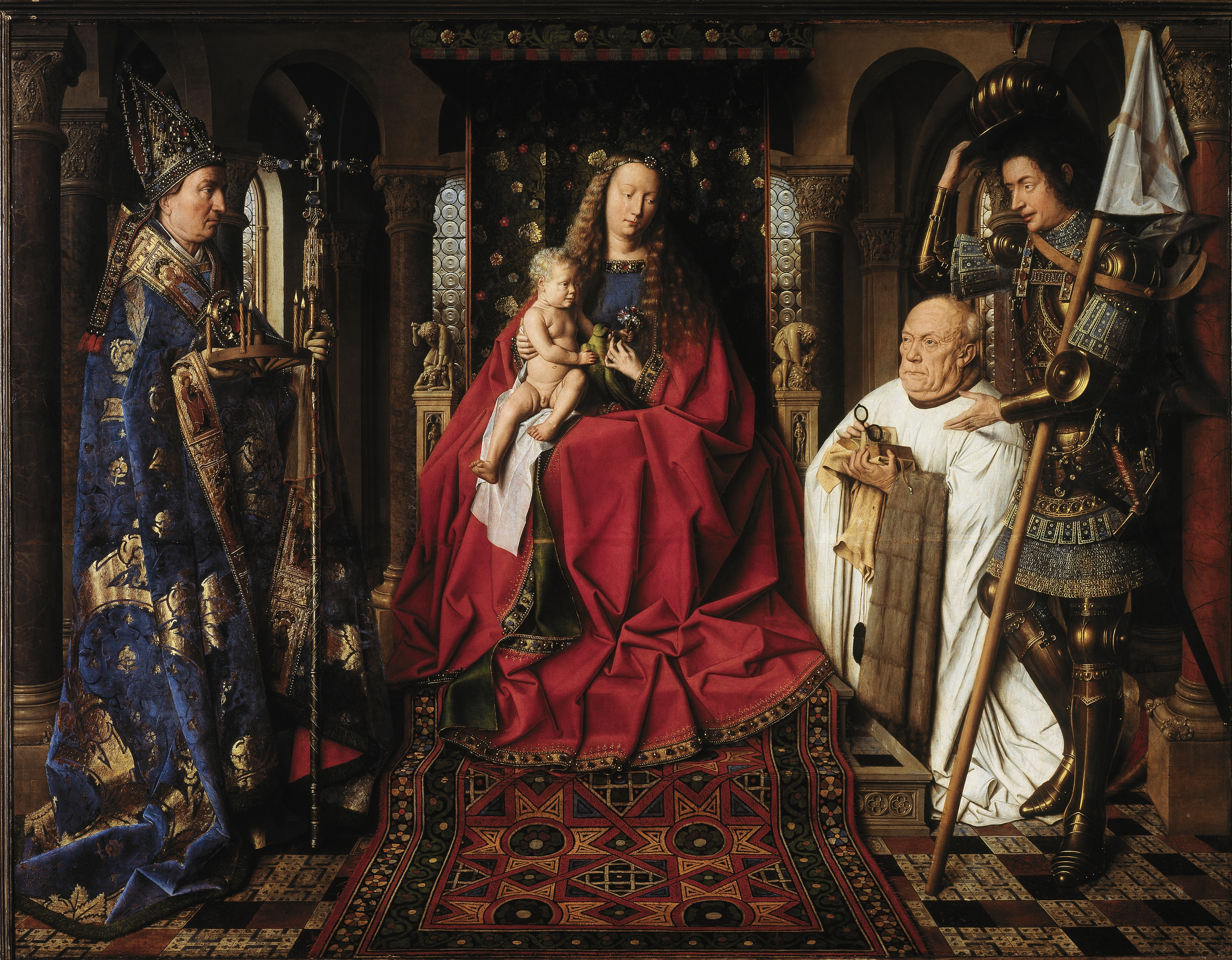
Jan van Eyck's The Madonna with Canon van der Paele is one of the masterpieces of the museum

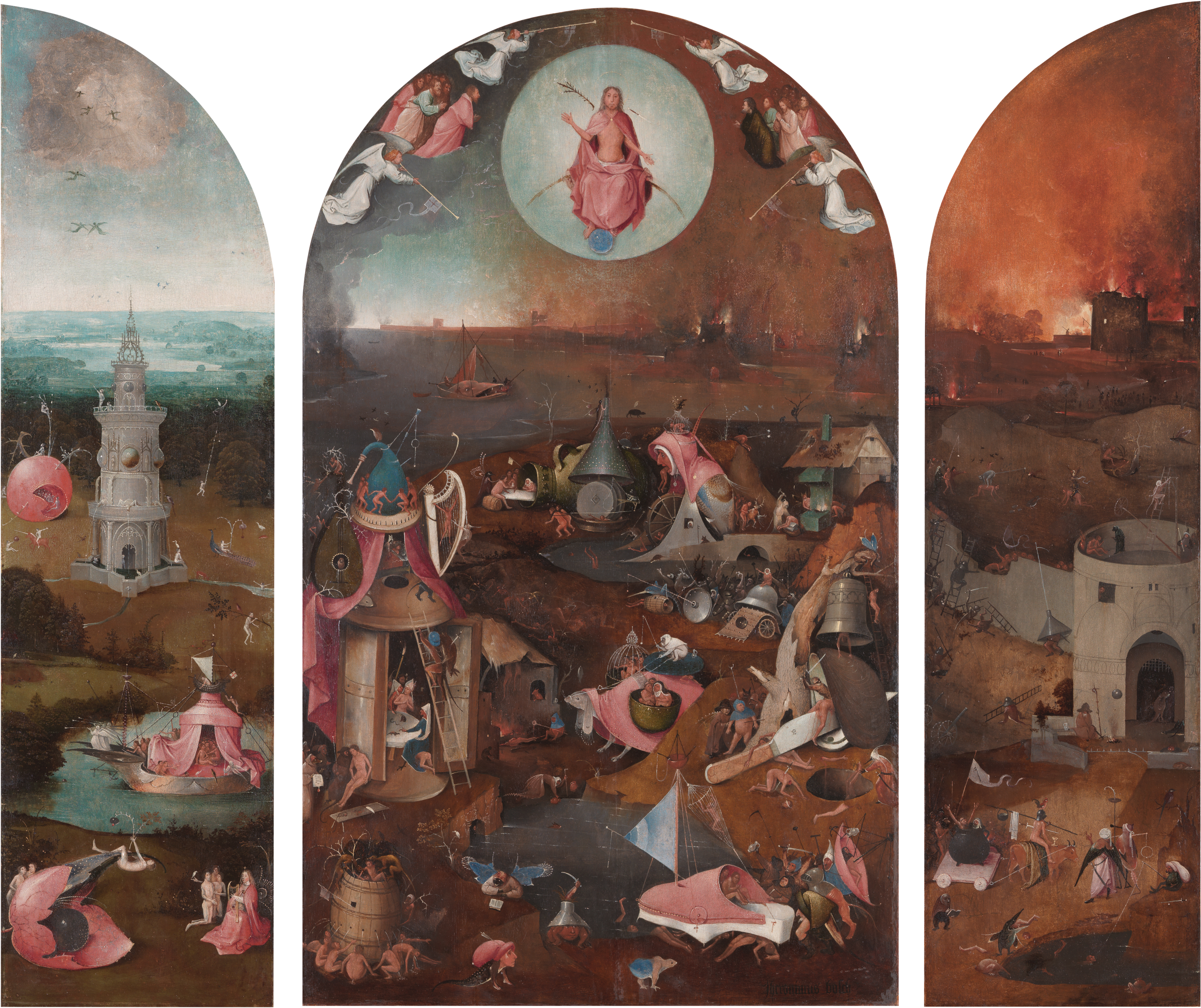
Hieronymus Bosch's The Last Judgement (c. 1486

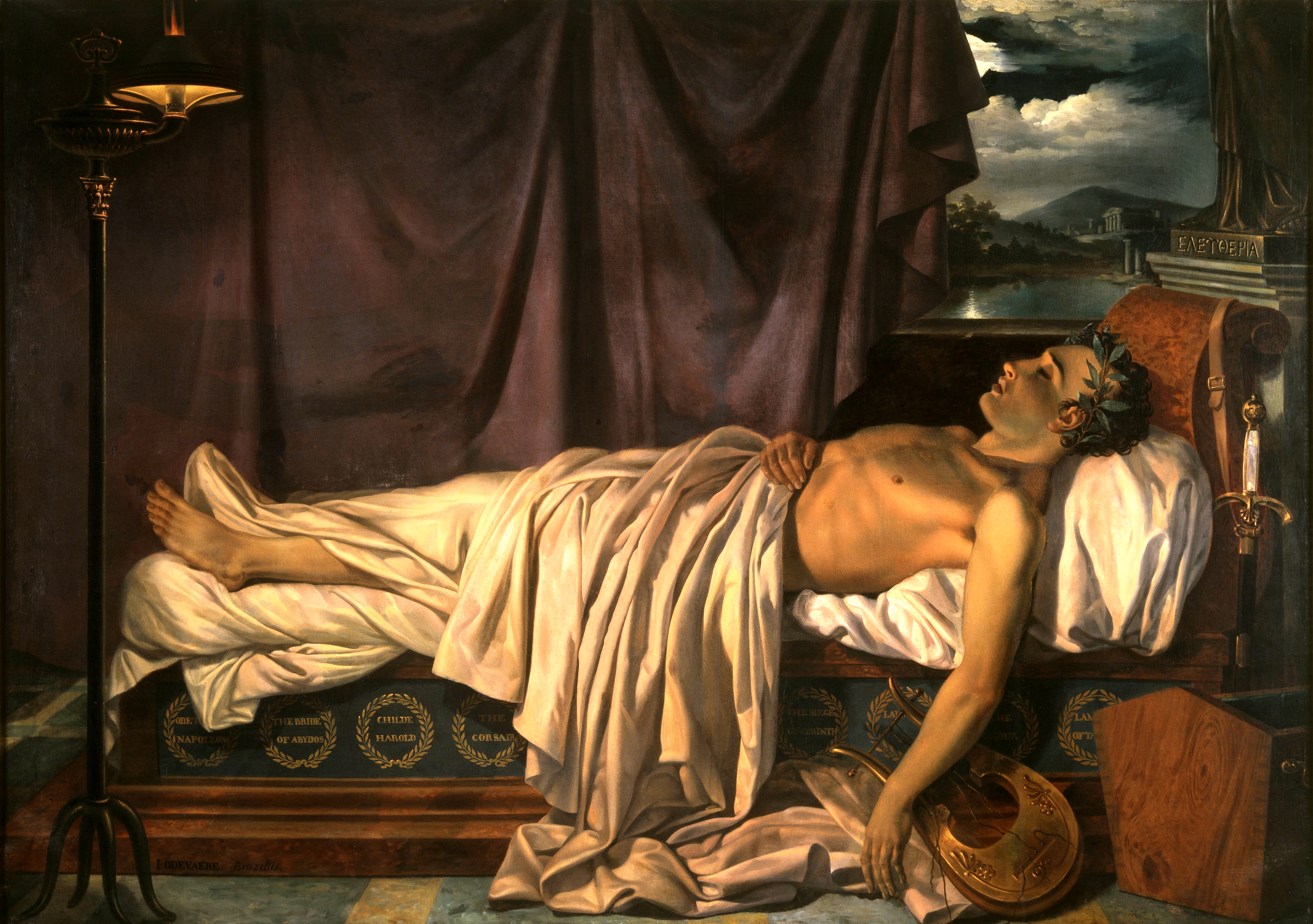
Joseph Denis Odevaere, Lord Byron on his Death-bed

The Groeningemuseum is a municipal museum in Bruges, Belgium, built on the site of the medieval Eekhout Abbey.

It houses a collection of Flemish and Belgian painting covering six centuries, from Jan van Eyck to Marcel Broodthaers. The museum's highlights include Early Netherlandish paintings, works by Renaissance and Baroque masters, as well as a selection of paintings from the 18th and 19th century neo-classical and realist periods, milestones of Belgian symbolism and modernism, masterpieces of Flemish Expressionism and many items from the city's collection of post-war modern art.

== Collection ==
- Jan van Eyck:
  - The Madonna with Canon van der Paele (1436)
  - Portrait of Margareta van Eyck (1439)
  - Portrait of Christ (1440)
- Pieter Pourbus
- Gerard David
  - The Judgment of Cambyses Part 1, The Judgment of Sisamnes (1498)
  - The Judgment of Cambyses Part 2, The Flaying of Sisamnes (1498)
  - The Baptism of Christ (1502–1508)
- Hieronymus Bosch and workshop
  - The Last Judgement (c. 1486)
- Adriaen Isenbrandt:
  - Portrait of Paulus de Nigro (1518)
  - Triptych
- Hugo van der Goes
  - Death of the Virgin (c. 1472–1480)
- Nicolaes Maes:
  - Portrait of Four Children (1657)
- Jan Provoost
  - Crucifixion (c. 1500)
  - Last Judgment for the Bruges town hall (1525)
- Dirk Bouts
  - Triptych of the 'Martyrdom of St. Hippolytus'
- Fernand Khnopff
  - Secret-Reflet
- René Magritte
  - L'Attentat
- Vigor van Heede
  - Allegorical portrait of a man

== Sources ==
- De Vos, Dirk (1987). Groeningemuseum Bruges. Bruges: Die Keure. ISBN 978-9-05544-084-9.
- van Uffelen, Chris (2010). Contemporary Museums - Architecture, History, Collections. Braun Publishing. pp. 164–165. ISBN 978-3-03768-067-4.
