= The Baptism of Christ (David) =

Triptych by Gerard David

Baptême du Christ
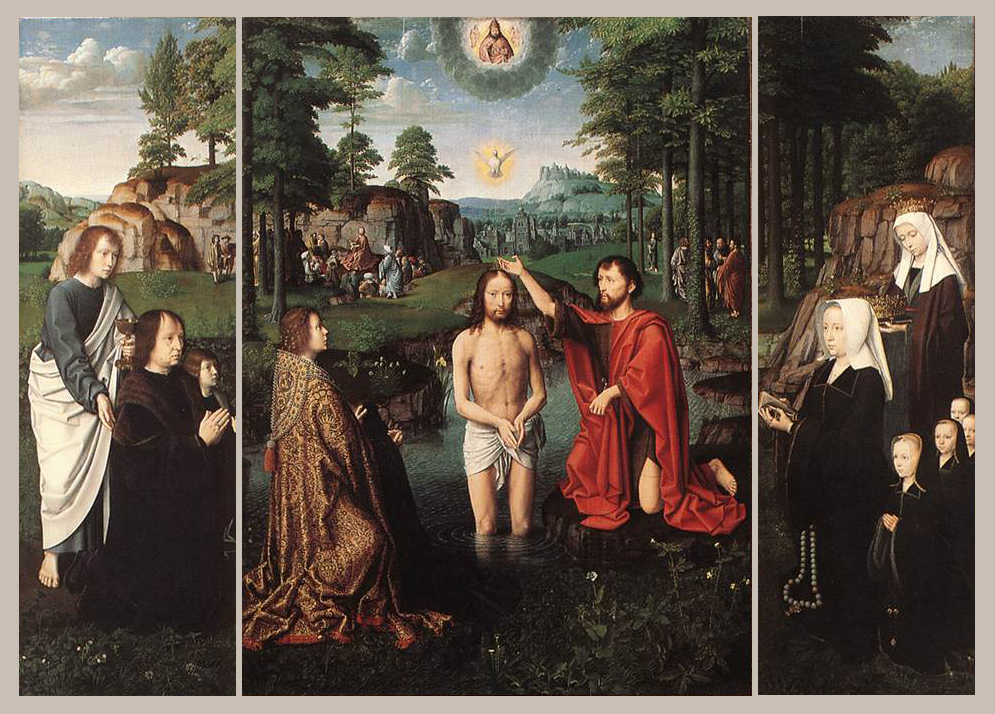
- Artist: Gerard David
- Year: c. 1502–1508
- Medium: Oil on panel
- Dimensions: 132 cm × 181,9 cm (52 in × 716 in)
- Location: Groeningemuseum, Bruges

The Baptism of Christ or the Jan des Trompes Triptych is an altarpiece painted between 1502 and 1508 by the Flemish painter Gerard David. It is now in the Groeningemuseum in Bruges, Belgium.

== Description ==
Its central panel is 127.9 cm high by 96.6 cm wide and shows Christ's baptism in the Jordan, with an angel holding Christ's clothing and God the Father and the Holy Spirit in the form of a dove above Christ. In the background is a landscape with scenes from the life of John the Baptist, whilst the foreground is filled with plants and flowers.

The side panels are 132 cm high by 43.1 and 43.2 cm wide, and contain donor portraits. They show the donors and their children – on the left panel is Jan de Trompes, treasurer of Bruges, being presented by John the Evangelist, his name saint, whilst his second wife Elisabeth van der Meersch is shown being presented by her name saint, Elisabeth of Hungary. The landscape flows across all three panels.

== Bibliography ==
- (in Spanish) Patrick de Rynck, Cómo leer la pintura, « Gerard David, Triptyque avec "le bautismo de Christ" », Groupe Éditorial Random House Mondadori, S.L., 2005, pp. 110–111 ISBN 84-8156-388-9
- (in Spanish) Walter, Ingo F. (ed.), Los maestros de la pintura occidental, «Gerard David, "Le bautismo de Christ" », Tome I, Taschen, 2005, p. 199, ISBN 3-8228-4744-5
