= Legally Blind (TV series) =

2017 Philippine television drama series

- Title card
- Genre: Drama
- Created by: Pam Miras
- Written by: Christine Novicio; Anna Aleta Nadela; Rona Lean Sales
- Directed by: Ricky Davao
- Creative director: Roy Iglesias
- Starring: Janine Gutierrez
- Theme music composer: Simon Tan
- Opening theme: "Pangarap" by Maricris Garcia
- Country of origin: Philippines
- Original language: Tagalog
- No. of episodes: 93 (list of episodes)

Production
- Executive producer: Michele R. Borja
- Producer: Arlene D. Pilapil
- Editors: Maita Dator-Causapin; Bot Tana; Lawrence Villena
- Camera setup: Multiple-camera setup
- Running time: 23–32 minutes
- Production company: GMA Entertainment TV

Original release
- Network: GMA Network
- Release: February 20 – June 30, 2017

Legally Blind is a 2017 Philippine television drama series broadcast by GMA Network. Directed by Ricky Davao, it stars Janine Gutierrez. It premiered on February 20, 2017 on the network's Afternoon Prime line up. The series concluded on June 30, 2017, with a total of 93 episodes.

The series is streaming online on YouTube.

== Premise ==
Grace is about to fulfill her dream of being a lawyer. On the day to celebrate the results of her bar exam results, she will be raped leading to her pregnancy and an accident that will lead to her blindness.

== Cast and characters ==
Cast

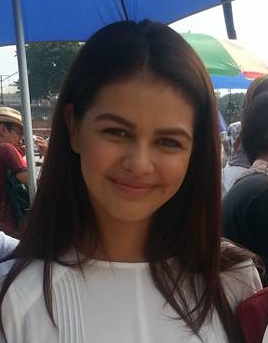
Janine Gutierrez

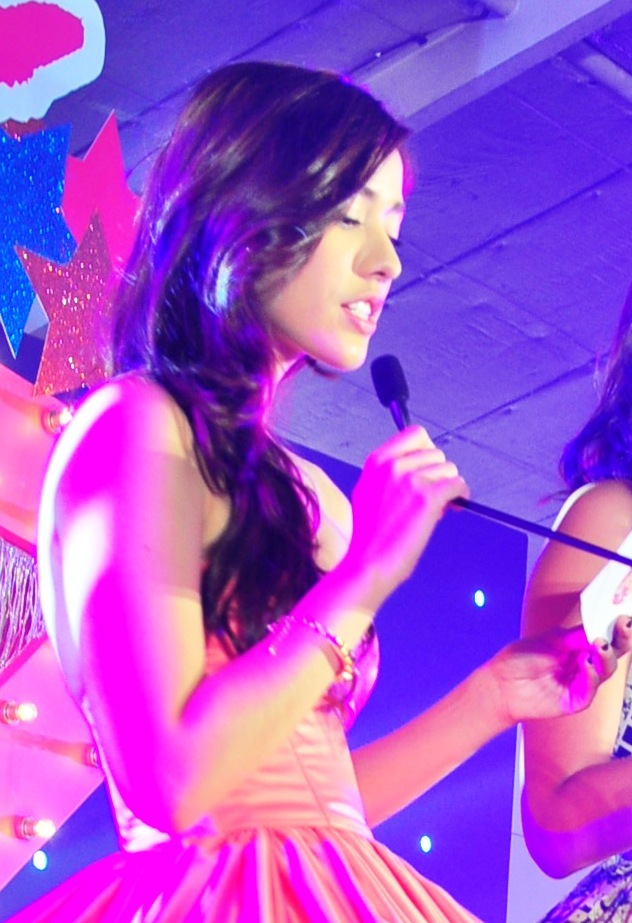
Lauren Young

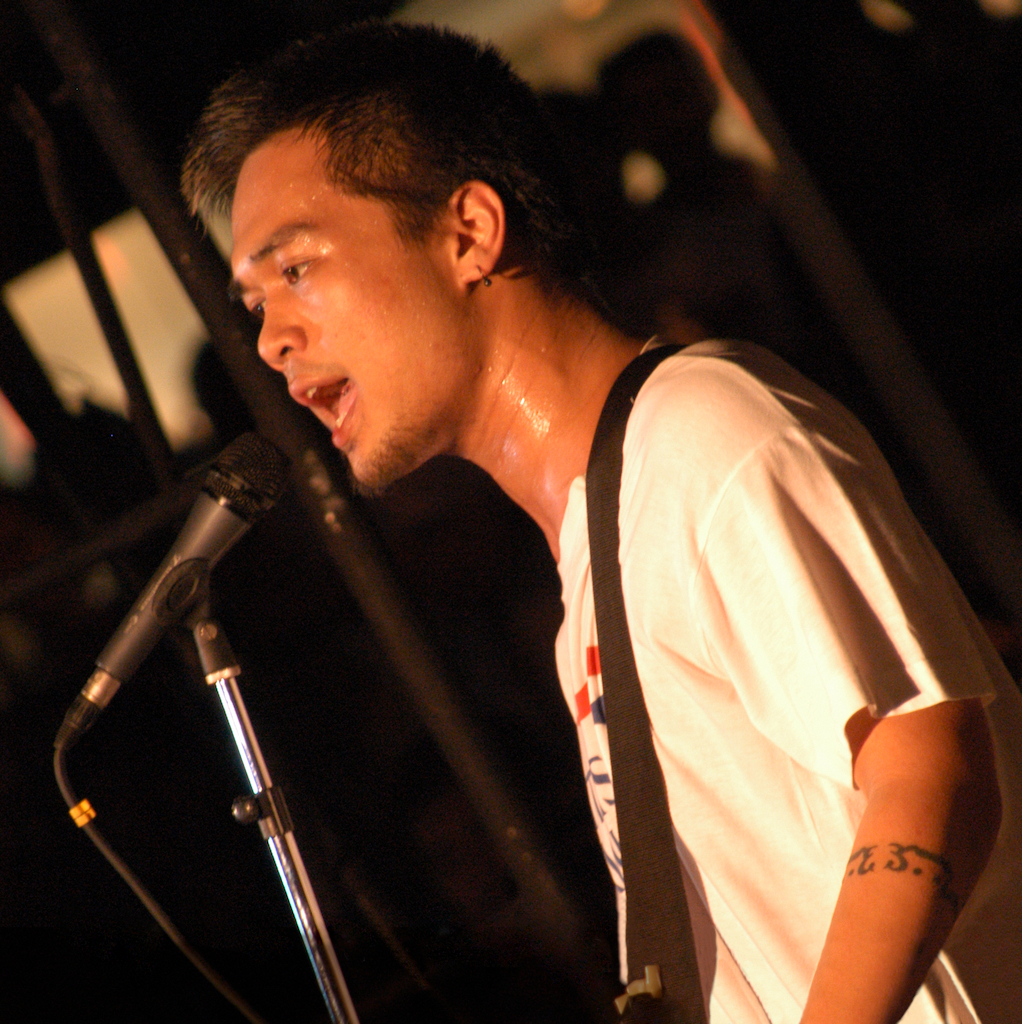
Marc Abaya

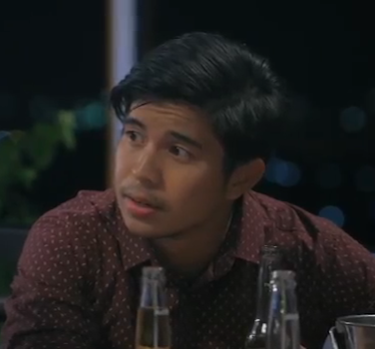
Rodjun Cruz

Lead cast

- Janine Gutierrez as Grace Reyes Evangelista-Villareal

Supporting cast

- Mikael Daez as Edward Villareal
- Lauren Young as Charina "Charie" Reyes Evangelista
- Marc Abaya as William Villareal
- Rodjun Cruz as Joel Apostol
- Chanda Romero as Marissa Reyes-Evangelista
- Therese Malvar as Nina Reyes Evangelista
- Lucho Ayala as John Castillo
- Ashley Rivera as Diana Perez
- Camille Torres as Elizabeth Guevarra Anton Villareal

Guest cast

- Ricky Davao as Manuel Evangelista
- Denise Barbacena as Sabrina
- Max Collins as Darlene Santos-Aguirre
- Thea Tolentino as Maricar Nuevo
- Paolo Gumabao as Chanston Aguirre
- Rolly Innocencio as a lawyer
- Dexter Doria as Martha
- Dex Quindoza as Morgan Campos
- Rob Sy as Marcus
- Rafael Siguion-Reyna as Henry
- Madeleine Nicolas as Stella Villareal
- Menggie Cobarrubias as Anton Villareal
- Elijah Alejo as younger Grace
- Dayara Shane as younger Charie

== Production ==
Principal photography commenced in January 2017.

== Ratings ==
According to AGB Nielsen Philippines' Nationwide Urban Television Audience Measurement ratings, the pilot episode of Legally Blind earned a 12% rating. The final episode scored a 6.2% rating in Nationwide Urban Television Audience Measurement People in television homes.

== Accolades ==
Accolades received by Legally Blind
Year	Award	Category	Recipient	Result	Ref.
2017	31st PMPC Star Awards for Television	Best Daytime Drama Series	Legally Blind	Nominated	
2017	31st PMPC Star Awards for Television	Best Drama Actress	Janine Gutierrez	Nominated	
2017	31st PMPC Star Awards for Television	Best Drama Supporting Actor	Marc Abaya	Nominated	
2017	31st PMPC Star Awards for Television	Best Drama Supporting Actress	Chanda Romero	Nominated	
