= Biberach Master =

German sculptor

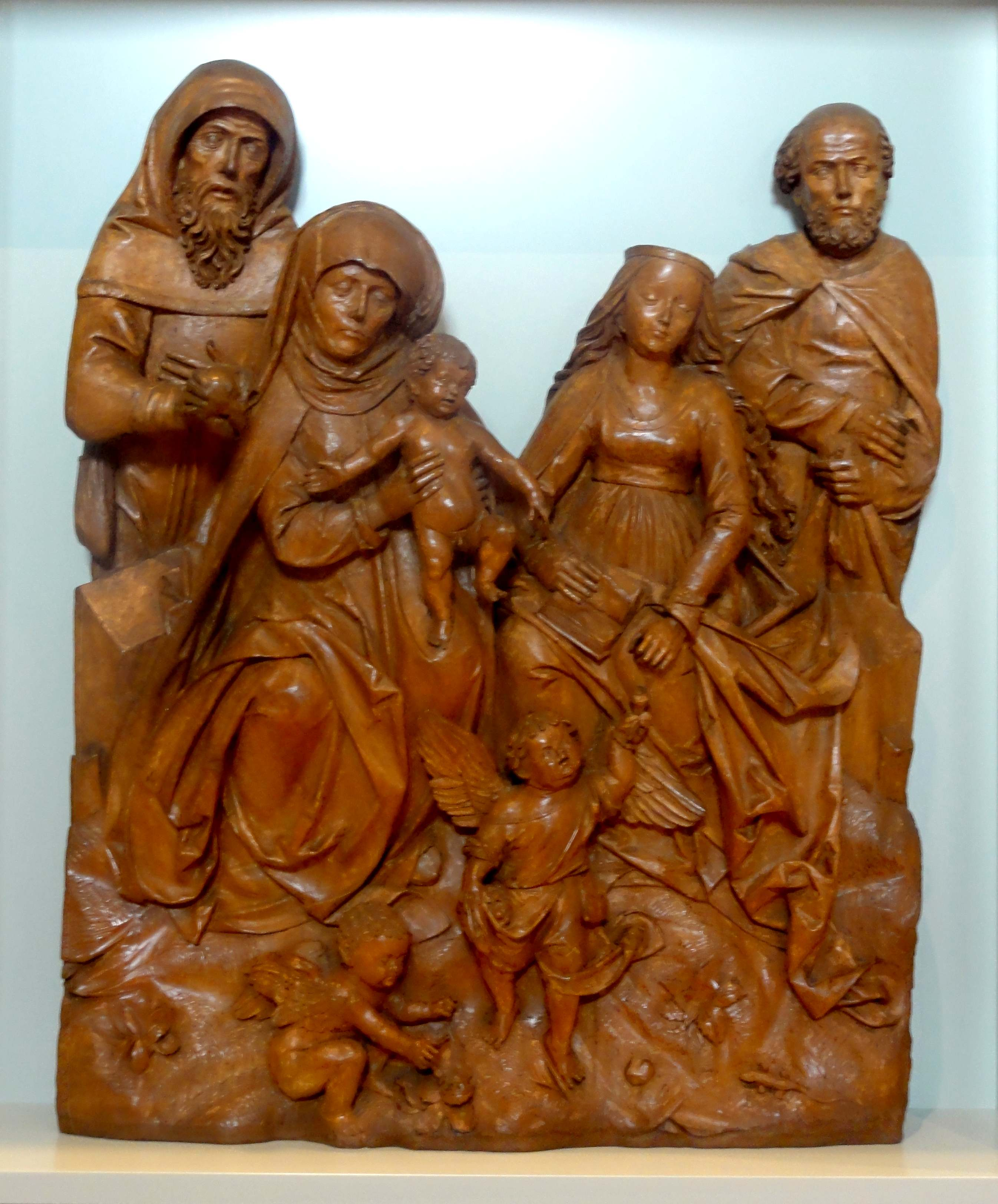
Holy Kinship, Dominikanermuseum, Rottweil

The Biberach Master or Master of the Holy Kinship of Biberach was one of the most important sculptors in wood in Swabia between 1500 and 1530. His works include The Last Judgement (Lyon).

Studies published in 1933 by Hans Rott made an attempt to identify the master of the Biberach clan with the carver Michael Zeynsler, who came from Memmingen. The thesis was initially well received, but is viewed with great skepticism by modern researchers. In 1952/53, Gertrud Otto presented her research results on the master's œuvre, which attested to his extensive oeuvre. This listing is regarded by researchers today with great skepticism, since the listed works do not result in a homogeneous whole and especially the assigned works of the middle and late period do not reach the quality of the generally recognized works.

== Sources ==
- http://www.musee-moyenage.fr/media/documents-pdf/dossiers-de-presse/dossier-de-presse-exposition-sculptures-souabes.pdf
