= The Last Judgement (Biberach Master) =

Carved limewood altarpiece

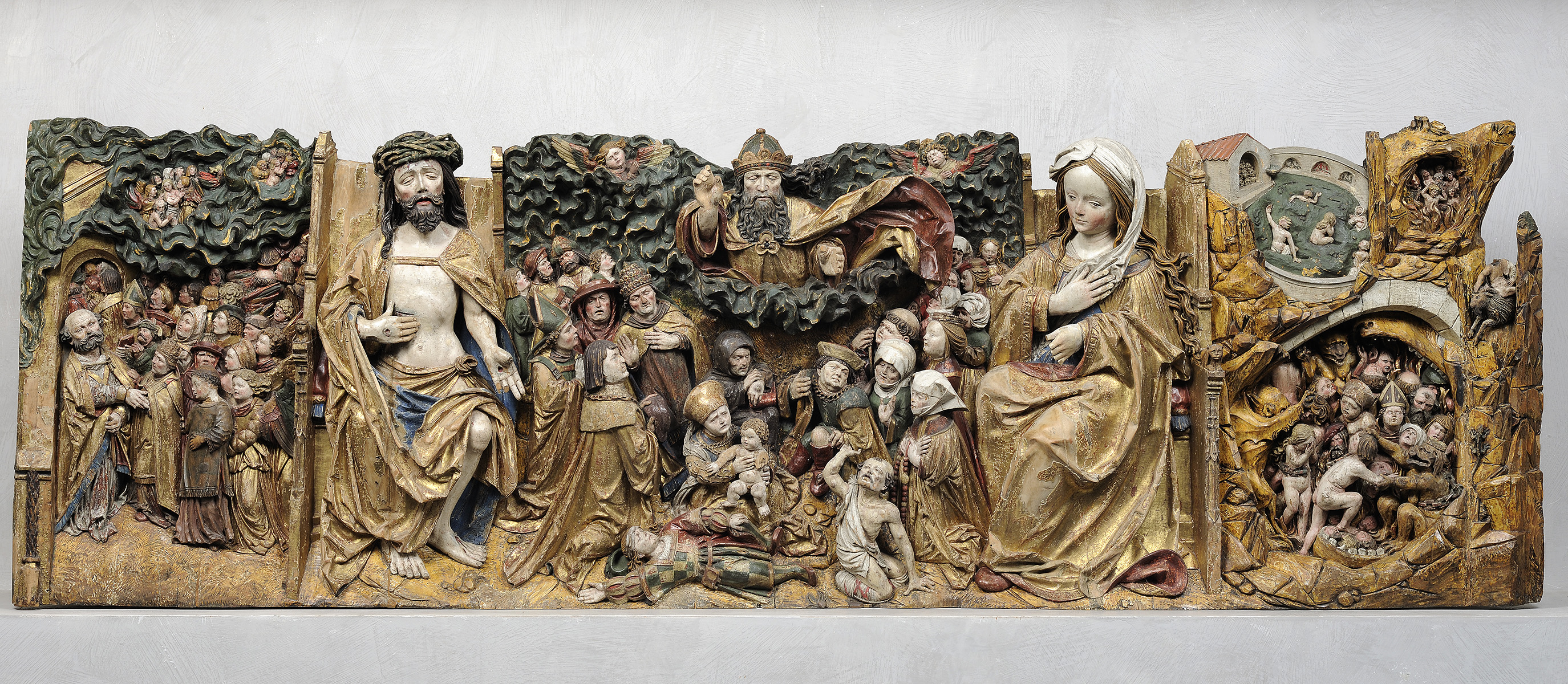

The Last Judgement or Scene of Intercession is part of a 1510-1520 carved limewood altarpiece produced at Biberach. It is attributed to the Biberach Master or his studio and is now in the Museum of Fine Arts of Lyon.

== Sources ==
- http://www.culture.gouv.fr/public/mistral/joconde_fr?ACTION=CHERCHER&FIELD_1=REF&VALUE_1=000SC025052
