= The Last Judgment (Bosch, Bruges) =

Painting attributed to Hieronymus Bosch

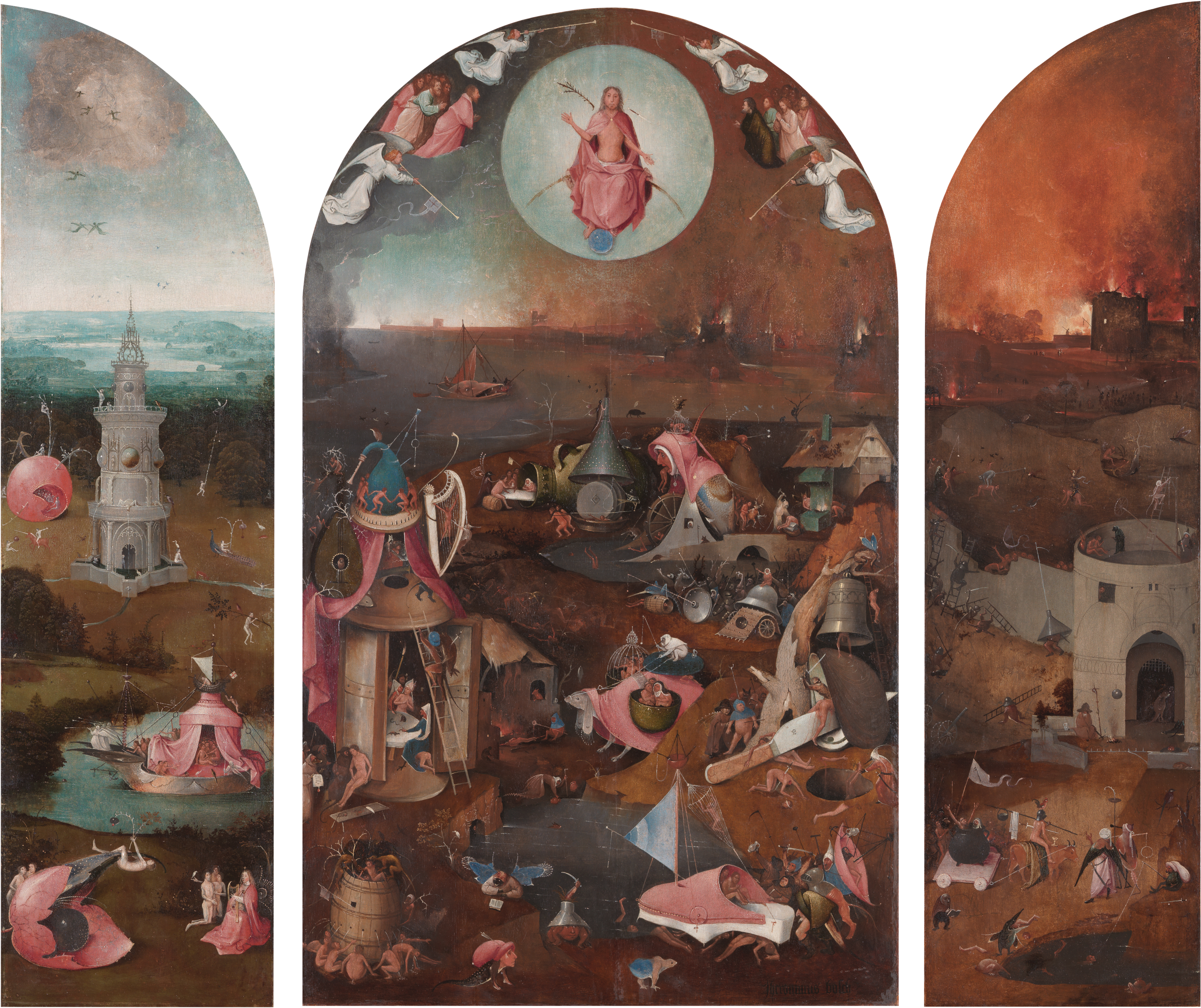
- Artists: Hieronymus Bosch and workshop
- Year: c. 1486
- Type: Oil-on-wood triptych
- Dimensions: 99 cm × 117.5 cm (39 in × 46.3 in)
- Location: Groeningemuseum, Bruges

The Last Judgment is a triptych of disputed authorship, either by the Early Netherlandish master Hieronymus Bosch, his workshop, or a collaboration between artist and workshop. It was created after 1486. It is one of eight surviving triptychs by Bosch.

The triptych currently resides at the Groeningemuseum in Bruges, Belgium. The outside of the shutters are painted in grisaille, while the inside shutters and center are oil on panel.

== History ==
The work belonged to E. Gravet's collection, and then to Jacques Seligmann & Company, in Paris. In 1907 it was acquired by A. Bernaert, who donated it to the city of Bruges. In 1936 it was cleaned and was restored again in 1959. On that occasion, the grisaille painting of the external shutters was discovered, although damaged. The painting above the internal frames is lost.

The attribution of the work is dubious, due to its mediocre quality. Dendrochronologic analysis dated it from not before 1486.

The 2008 movie In Bruges features the work in a scene where the main characters visit the Groeningemuseum.

== Description ==
The painting's composition has similarities to The Last Judgment triptych in Vienna and The Garden of Earthly Delights: both show the Garden of Eden in the left panel and Hell at right.

As in other contemporary Flemish triptychs, the shutters are externally painted in grisaille with a Coronation with Thorns.

In the central panel is Christ as a judge within a celestial sphere, flanked by angels who are playing the Trumpets of Last Judgement, and by the apostles. Below him is the punishment of sinners which, like the Last Judgement of Vienna, continues in the Hell depiction at right. At left is Paradise, where the blessed souls are being shipped to Eden on a boat with a pink tent. The tower is a symbol of the Fountain of Eternal Youth, a more articulate version of which appears in the Garden of Delights.

The central panel is mostly occupied by insect-like demons who torture the men, with punishments that include burning, eating impure food (the gluttonous) etc., all inspired by Netherlandish Proverbs. The infernal city at right is under siege by demons, while a fire is visible in the far background.

== See also ==
- List of paintings by Hieronymus Bosch
- The Haywain Triptych
- The Last Judgment (Bosch triptych fragment)
- The Last Judgment (Bosch triptych)
- Early Netherlandish art
- Triptych

== Sources ==
- Romano, Eileen (2005). Bosco. Unidad Editorial. ISBN 84-89780-69-2.
- Varallo, Franca (2004). Bosch. Milan: Skira. ISBN 978-88-572-0615-8.
