= Vigor van Heede =

Flemish painter

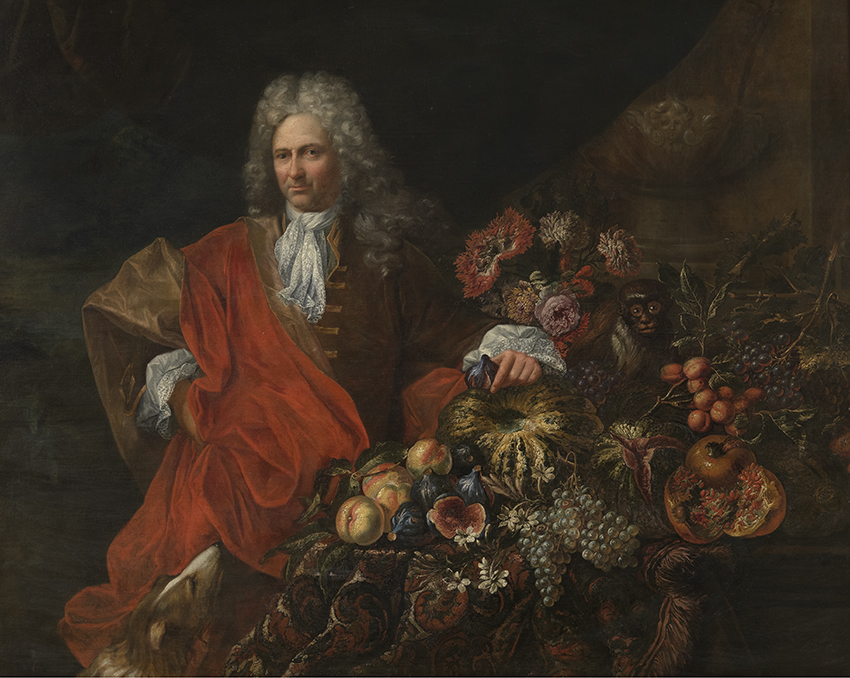
Allegoric portrait of a man by Vigor van Heede, 1681 – 1700, Groeningemuseum

Vigor van Heede (1661 – 8 April 1708) was a Flemish painter. He and his brother Willem traveled to France, Germany, and Italy. While his brother stayed longer in Italy, Vigor sojourned longer in Rome, where he improved so much that the price for his paintings became exceedingly high and the Holy Roman Emperor Leopold I invited him to his court.

He favored painting still lifes and history paintings.

== Biography ==
He was born in Veurne, in Flanders, in 1661, to Jan van Heede. His older brother Willem was also a painter.

He and his brother traveled to France, Germany, and Italy. It was in Italy that Vigor, and his brother Willem, perfected their techniques. They lived for a long time in Italy, and therefore left in this country the majority of their works. Willem resided for a longer time in Italy. However, Vigor sojourned longer in Rome.

In Rome, Vigor improved so much that the price for his paintings soared impressively. His reputation grew to such an extent that the Holy Roman Emperor Leopold I invited him to work in his court. Heede would also work for other princes in Germany. He often painted still lifes and history paintings.

Pilkington writes that in his day (18th century) Heede's works could be seen in Rome, Venice, and Naples. Pilkington also wrote that an important work of this master, depicting the martyrdom of a Saint, could be seen in Heede's hometown of Veurne, in the local Church of Saint Walburg (Sint-Walburgakerk). Pilkington compared Heede's painting to de Lairesse's style, "full of spirit and genius in the composition", with colors having a natural tone and with a judicious chiaroscuro.

He died in his hometown of Veurne on 8 April 1708.

== Sources ==
- Groenendijk, Pieter, Beknopt biografisch lexicon van Zuid- en Noord-Nederlandse schilders, graveurs, glasschilders, tapijtwevers et cetera van ca. 1350 tot ca. 1720, Leiden: Primavera (2008)
- Nieuwen verlichter der konst-schilders, vernissers, vergulders en marmelaers en alle andere liefhebbers dezer lofbaere konsten, Gend: Jan Gimblet (1786), 402
- Roberts-Jones, Philippe, De Wilde, Éliane & Dechaux, Carine (eds.) Le dictionnaire des peintres belges du XIVe siècle à nos jours: depuis les premiers maîtres des anciens Pays-Bas méridionaux et de la principauté de Liège jusqu’aux artistes contemporains, Bruxelles: La Renaissance du Livre, 1995
- De Maere, J. & Webbes, M., Martin, Jennifer A. (ed.) Illustrated dictionary of 17th century Flemish painters (3 vols.), Brussels: La Renaissance du Livre (1994)
- De Seyn, Eug. M.H., Dessinateurs, graveurs et peintres des anciens Pays-Bas: écoles flamande et hollandaise, Turnhout: Brepols (1947)
- Van der Willigen, Adriaan & Meijer, Fred G., A dictionary of Dutch and Flemish still-life painters working in oils, 1525-1725, Leiden: Primavera Press, 2003
- Wouters, Jean François de, Nieuwen verlichter der konst-schilders, vernissers, vergulders en marmelaers, en andere liefhebbers dezer lofbaere konsten, Gend : Philippe Gimblet en gebroeders, 1777
- Thieme, Ulrich; Becker, Felix, Allgemeines Lexikon der bildenden Künstler : von der Antike bis zur Gegenwart, Leipzig : Seemann, 1907-1950
- A checklist of painters c1200-1976 represented in the Witt Library, Courtauld Institute of Art, London [first ed.], London : Mansell, 1978
- Allgemeines Künstlerlexikon: Bio-bibliographischer Index A-Z, Saur, 1999-2000
- Willigen, Adriaan van der (1926-2001); Meijer, Fred G., A dictionary of Dutch and Flemish still-life painters working in oils : 1525-1725, Leiden [etc.] : Primavera [etc.], 2003
