= The Last Judgment (Bosch, Vienna) =

Triptych by Hieronymus Bosch, created after 1482

- The Last Judgment
- Artist: Hieronymus Bosch
- Year: c. 1482
- Type: Oil-on-wood triptych
- Dimensions: 163.7 cm × 242 cm (64.4 in × 95 in)
- Location: Academy of Fine Arts, Vienna

The Last Judgment is a triptych by the Early Netherlandish artist Hieronymus Bosch, created after 1482.

The triptych is now in the Academy of Fine Arts in Vienna, Austria. The outside of the shutters panel are painted in grisaille on panel, while the inside shutters and the center panel are painted in oil. The left and right panels measure 167.7 x 60 cm and the center panel measures 164 x 127 cm. It is not to be confused with either a fragmented piece of art by Bosch under the same title (now at Munich), or another full painting by Bosch, possibly by a painter in his workshop.

The left panel shows the Garden of Eden: at the top God is shown seated in Heaven, while the Rebel Angels are cast out of Heaven and transformed into insects. At the foot of the panel, God creates Eve from the rib of Adam. In the mid-ground Eve is tempted by the Serpent. Towards the center of the panel, Adam and Eve are chased by the Angel into the dark forest. In the central panel, Jesus judges the souls while surrounded by the Saints. The right panel shows a hellscape, where the wicked are punished.

== Provenance ==
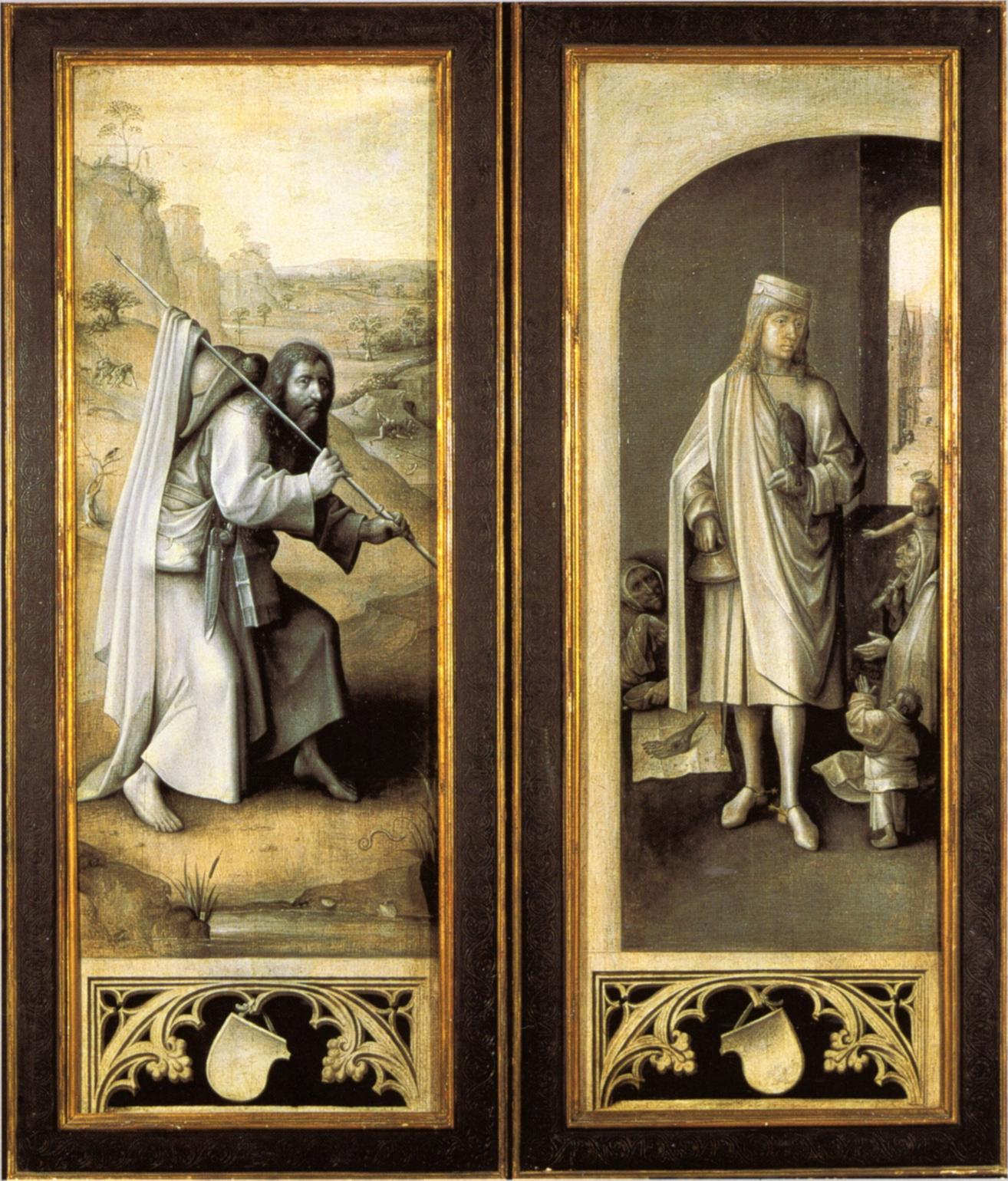
The closed triptych

The oldest mention of the painting is in a 1659 inventory of Archduke Leopold Wilhelm of Austria's collection, as by "Hieronimo Bosz". In the late 18th century, the work was acquired by Count Lambert-Sprinzenstein, from whom it later went to the current location. In the 17th-18th centuries, the triptych has been widely repainted and has lost part of the colors.

Some art historians identified this work as that acquired by Philip I of Castile in 1504, while others deny this. Dendrochronologic analysis proved that the painting was executed not before 1482 There is copy of the work, attributed to Lucas Cranach the Elder, in the Gemäldegalerie of Berlin.

== Description ==
The painting's composition has similarities with the Haywain Triptych or The Garden of Earthly Delights: both also show the Garden of Eden in the left panel and the Hell at right. The central panel depicts a Last Judgement, in a more obscure atmosphere than the Hell one.

=== Shutters ===
Like in other contemporary Flemish triptychs, the shutters are externally painted in grisaille, depicting two saints. At left is St. James in pilgrimage within a wicked land with a hanged man (perhaps a reference to some episode in the Golden Legend); at right is instead St. Bavo, the patron of Flanders, donating to the poor with his hawk on his left wrist.

One of the characters in the latter panel, the old woman with a child, appears in a drawing attributed to Bosch, now in a San Francisco private collection.

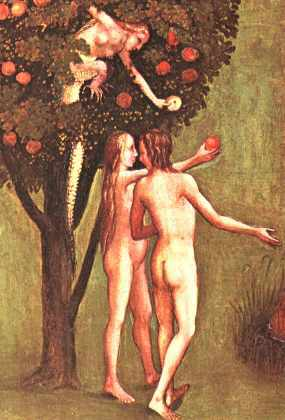
Detail of the left panel

=== Left panel ===
The left panel depicts the Garden of Eden of biblical history, as a green landscape in the lower three-quarters. In the upper section Bosch portrays God sitting on his throne, surrounded by a luminous halo. Around him is a cloudy sky, with angels fighting rebellious angels who are turning into devils as they fall.

Below are, reading from the bottom, God creating Eve from Adam's rib, with Adam sleeping at her feet; the Serpent tempting Eve and the tree of the knowledge of good and evil; and, finally, Adam and Eve expelled from the Garden by an angel, who holds a sword, into a dark forest.

=== Central panel ===
The central painting depicts a Last Judgement, based on John's Book of Revelation. Above is Christ as a judge, surrounded by the Virgin Mary, John the Evangelist and the apostles. The celestial zone, painted in a bright blue, contrasts with the rest of the panel, which is occupied by a dark brownish punishment of the Damned, while the Blessed occupy only a small portion.

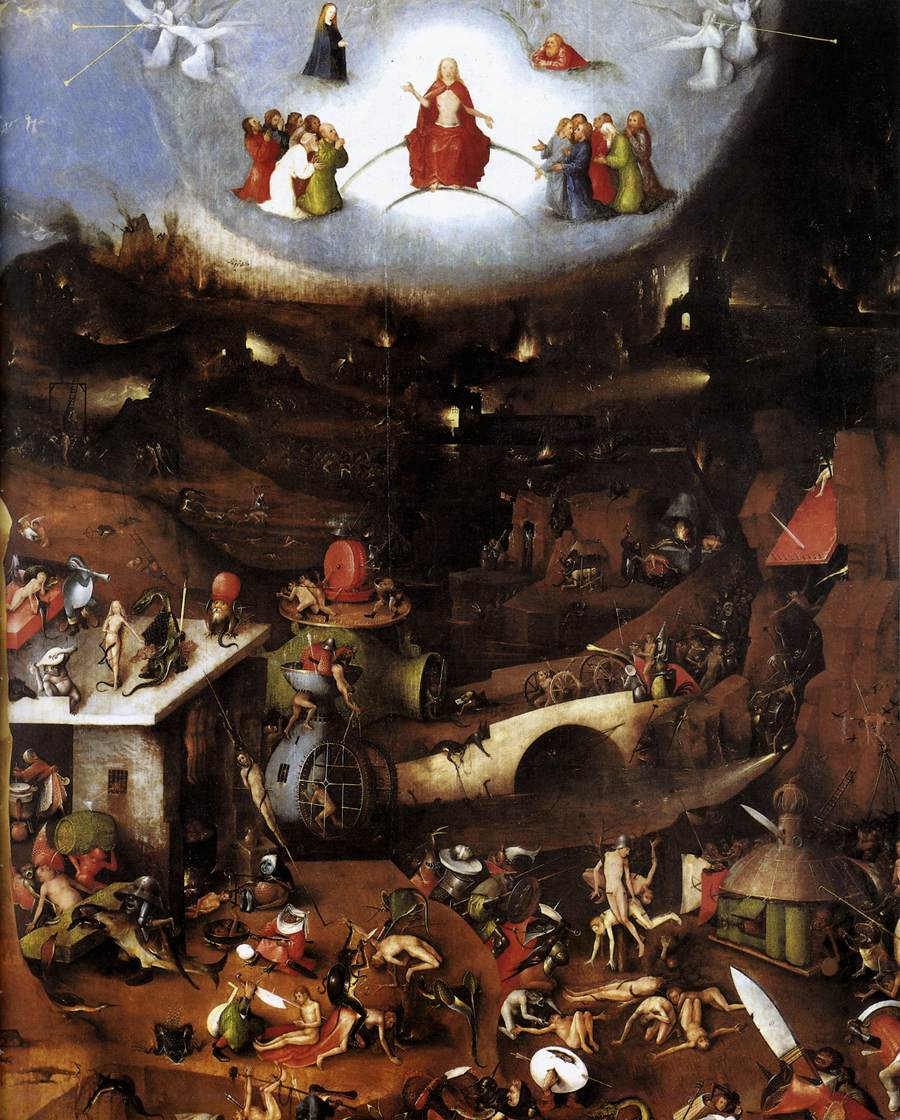
The central Last Judgement (upper and lower parts missing)

The punishments come from monstrous creatures of Hell: the damned are burned, speared, impaled, hung from butcher hooks, forced to eat impure food (the Gluttonous), or subjects to cogs of bizarre machines. This scene has strong similarities with the right panel in Bosch's Garden at the Museo del Prado.

=== Right panel ===
Thematically, the hell at right is not different from the Last Judgement. Satan, in the center, receives the damned souls. The torture scenes continue in this panel, within a dark landscape dominated by flames and devilish figures.

== See also ==
- List of paintings by Hieronymus Bosch

== Sources ==
- Romano, Eileen (2005). Bosco. Unidad Editorial. ISBN 84-89780-69-2.
- Varallo, Franca (2004). Bosch. Milan: Skira.
