= Last Judgement (Venusti) =

Painting by Marcello Venusti after Michelangelo

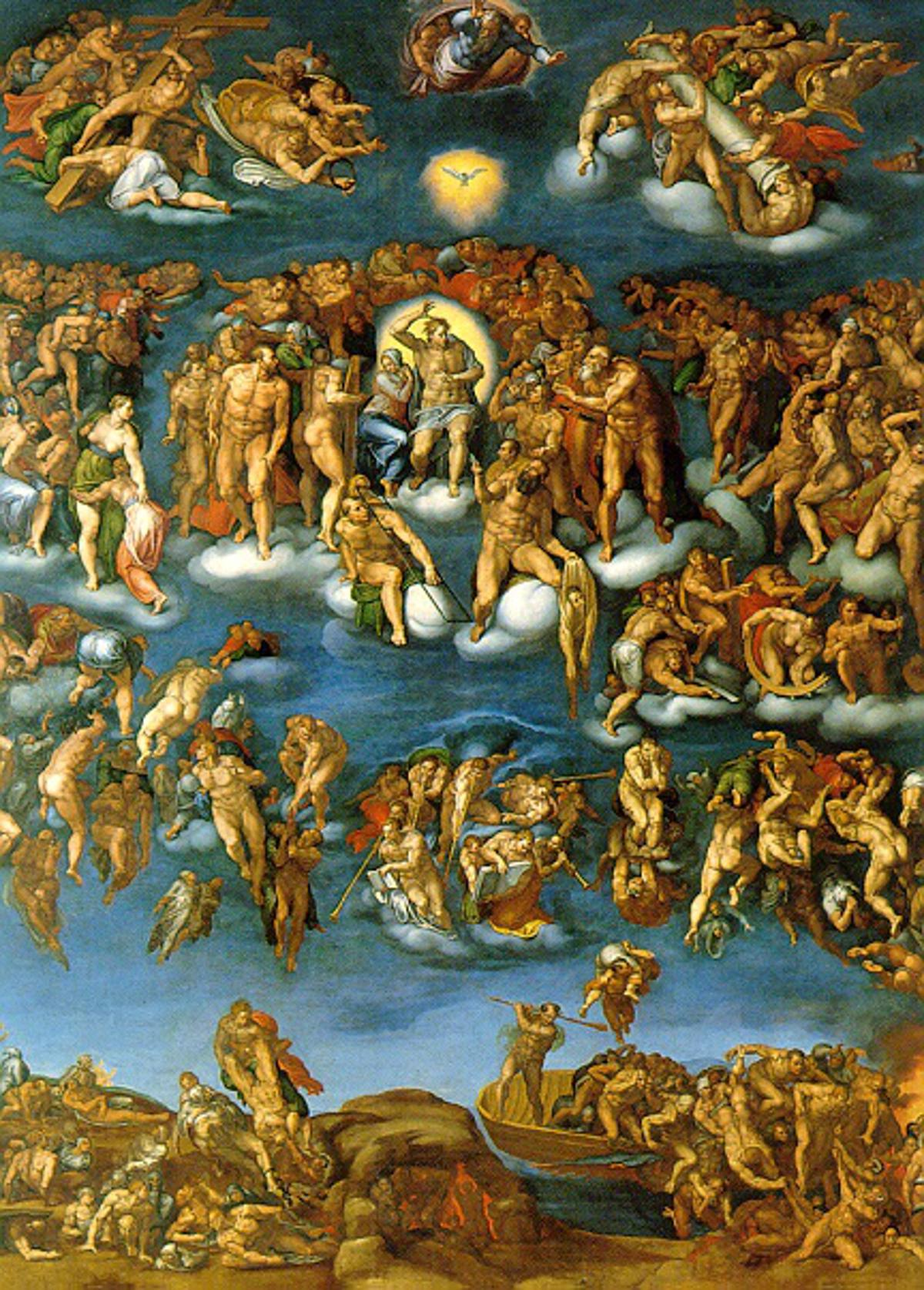

Last Judgement is a 1549 tempera on panel painting by Marcello Venusti after Michelangelo's Sistine Chapel The Last Judgement (1541). It is now in the National Museum of Capodimonte in Naples.

It was commissioned by cardinal Alessandro Farnese, who wanted a copy of Michelangelo's work for his family collection. It was moved to Naples with the rest of the collection at the end of the 18th century.

== Sources ==
- https://web.archive.org/web/20161126194454/http://www.cir.campania.beniculturali.it/itinerari-tematici/nei-siti-culturali/GRPT_INT3/T_INT22/OA900123
- Mariella Utili e Barbara Maria Savy, Museo di Capodimonte - La Galleria Farnese: dipinti italiani, Napoli, Electa Editore, 1999, ISBN 978-88-435-8618-9.
- Mario Sapio, Il Museo di Capodimonte, Napoli, Arte'm, 2012. ISBN 978-88-569-0303-4
- Touring Club Italiano, Museo di Capodimonte, Milano, Touring Club Editore, 2012. ISBN 978-88-365-2577-5
