= List of Legally Blind episodes =

Legally Blind is a 2017 Philippine television drama series broadcast by GMA Network. It premiered on the network's Afternoon Prime line up and worldwide on GMA Pinoy TV from February 20, 2017, to June 30, 2017, replacing Hahamakin ang Lahat.

NUTAM (Nationwide Urban Television Audience Measurement) People in Television Homes ratings are provided by AGB Nielsen Philippines.

== Series overview ==
Month	Episodes	Monthly averages
Month	Episodes	NUTAM
February 2017	7	13.5%
March 2017	23	10.9%
April 2017	18	6.1%
May 2017	23	5.5%
June 2017	22	6.7%

== Episodes ==
=== February 2017 ===
Episode		Original Air Date	Social media hashtag	AGB Nielsen NUTAM		
Episode		Original Air Date	Social media hashtag	Rating	Timeslot Rank	Ref.
1	Ang pangarap ni Grace	February 20, 2017	#LegallyBlind	12.0%	#2	
2	Trahedya	February 21, 2017	#LBTrahedya	14.1%	#1	
3	Nasirang Pangarap	February 22, 2017	#LBNasirangPangarap	13.6%	#1	
4	Bangon Grace	February 23, 2017	#LBBangonGrace	13.5%	#1	
5	Hello Edward	February 24, 2017	#LBHelloEdward	14.2%	#1	
6	Edward Helps Grace	February 27, 2017	#LBEdwardHelpsGrace	13.3%	#1	
7	Trauma ni Grace	February 28, 2017	#LBTraumaNiGrace	14.0%	#1	

=== March 2017 ===
Episode		Original Air Date	Social media hashtag	AGB Nielsen NUTAM		
Episode		Original Air Date	Social media hashtag	Rating	Timeslot Rank	Ref.
8	Buntis si Grace	March 1, 2017	#LBBuntisSiGrace	13.3%	#1	
9	Kaya mo yan, Grace	March 2, 2017	#LBKayaMoYanGrace	15.8%	#1	
10	Biyaya o Sumpa	March 3, 2017	#LBBiyayaOSumpa	14.4%	#1	
11	Emergency	March 6, 2017	#LBEmergency	14.0%	#1	
12	Bagong Hamon	March 7, 2017	#LBBagongHamon	13.0%	#1	
13	I Love You Grace	March 8, 2017	#LBILoveYouGrace	13.3%	#1	
14	Death Threat	March 9, 2017	#LBDeathThreat	13.6%	#1	
15	Attacker ni Grace	March 10, 2017	#LBAttackerNiGrace	13.1%	#2	
16	Desisyon ni Grace	March 13, 2017	#LBDesisyonNiGrace	—N/a		
17	Edward vs Joel	March 14, 2017	#LBEdwardVSJoel	—N/a		
18	Awat na, Charie	March 15, 2017	#LBAwatNaCharie	—N/a		
19	Finding, Charie	March 16, 2017	#LBFindingCharie	—N/a		
20	Marry Me, Grace	March 17, 2017	#LBMarryMeGrace	—N/a		
21	Laban, Edward	March 20, 2017	#LBLabanEdward	—N/a		
22	Grace Meets William	March 21, 2017	#LBGraceMeetsWilliam	—N/a		
23	Ang Paghaharap	March 22, 2017	#LBAngPaghaharap	—N/a		
24	Suspetsa	March 23, 2017	#LBSuspetsa	—N/a		
25	William and Charie	March 24, 2017	#LBWilliamAndCharie	—N/a		
				AGB Nielsen NUTAM People		
26	Pagbabalik ni Charie	March 27, 2017	#LBPagbabalikNiCharie	6.1%	#1	
27	Sizzling Rivalry	March 28, 2017	#LBSizzlingRivalry	6.1%	#1	
28	Kutob ni William	March 29, 2017	#LBKutobNiWilliam	5.7%	#1	
29	Takbo, Grace, Takbo	March 30, 2017	#LBTakboGraceTakbo	6.0%	#1	
30	Paandar ni William	March 31, 2017	#LBPaandarNiWilliam	6.9%	#1	

=== April 2017 ===
Episode		Original Air Date	Social media hashtag	AGB Nielsen NUTAM People		
Episode		Original Air Date	Social media hashtag	Rating	Daytime Rank	Ref.
31	Grace in Danger	April 3, 2017	#LBGraceInDanger	6.7%	#1	
32	Bait-baitan si William	April 4, 2017	#LBBaitBaitanSiWilliam	6.2%	#1	
33	Confession ni Grace	April 5, 2017	#LBConfessionNiGrace	6.6%	#1	
34	Panlilinlang	April 6, 2017	#LBPanlilinlang	6.7%	#1	
35	Misleading Grace	April 7, 2017	#LBMisleadingGrace	6.4%	#1	
36	The Accused	April 10, 2017	#LBTheAccused	6.3%	#1	
37	Wrong Suspect	April 11, 2017	#LBWrongSuspect	7.0%	#1	
38	Double Date	April 12, 2017	#LBDoubleDate	7.0%	#1	
39	Ekis Gang	April 17, 2017	#LBEkisGang	6.0%	#1	
40	Security ni Grace	April 18, 2017	#LBSecurityNiGrace	5.8%	#1	
41	Mag-ingat ka, Edward	April 19, 2017	#LBMagIngatKaEdward	5.4%	#1	
42	Resbak kay Edward	April 20, 2017	#LBResbakKayEdward	6.0%	#1	
43	Mastermind	April 21, 2017	#LBMastermind	5.9%	#1	
44	Stalking Grace	April 24, 2017	#LBStalkingGrace	5.9%	#2	
45	Kalupitan ni William	April 25, 2017	#LBKalupitanNiWilliam	5.5%	#2	
46	Hidden Camera	April 26, 2017	#LBHiddenCamera	5.8%	#2	
47	Walang Kawala	April 27, 2017	#LBWalangKawala	5.8%	#1	
48	Bantay Salakay	April 28, 2017	#LBBantaySalakay	5.5%	#2	

=== May 2017 ===
Episode		Original Air Date	Social media hashtag	AGB Nielsen NUTAM People		
Episode		Original Air Date	Social media hashtag	Rating	Timeslot Rank	Ref.
49	Traydor	May 1, 2017	#LBTraydor	6.0%	#1	
50	Trauma ni Edward	May 2, 2017	#LBTraumaNiEdward	5.7%	#1	
51	Bagong Pagsubok	May 3, 2017	#LBBagongPagsubok	5.7%	#2	
52	Maling Gamot	May 4, 2017	#LBMalingGamot	5.5%	#2	
53	Pagbabago ni Edward	May 5, 2017	#LBPagbabagoNiEdward	5.4%	#2	
54	Abuso	May 8, 2017	#LBAbuso	5.2%	#2	
55	Manipulasyon	May 9, 2017	#LBManipulasyon	4.8%	#2	
56	Sabotahe ni William	May 10, 2017	#LBSabotaheNiWilliam	5.1%	#2	
57	Suspetsa ni Grace	May 11, 2017	#LBSuspetsaNiGrace	5.1%	#2	
58	Saklolo	May 12, 2017	#LBSaklolo	4.8%	#2	
59	Inggiterang Charie	May 15, 2017	#LBInggiterangCharie	5.1%	#2	
60	Arestado	May 16, 2017	#LBArestado	4.9%	#2	
61	Pagkilos ni Grace	May 17, 2017	#LBPagkilosNiGrace	5.8%	#1	
62	Laban, Grace, Laban	May 18, 2017	#LBLabanGraceLaban	6.4%	#1	
63	Matinding Rebelasyon	May 19, 2017	#LBMatindingRebelasyon	7.3%	#1	
64	Magbabayad ka, William	May 22, 2017	#LBMagbabayadKaWilliam	7.6%	#1	
65	Panggigipit	May 23, 2017	#LBPanggigipit	6.9%	#1	
66	Sobra ka na, Charie	May 24, 2017	#LBSobraKaNaCharie	7.3%	#1	
67	Paalam, Nina	May 25, 2017	#LBPaalamNina	7.3%	#1	
68	Guilty si Charie	May 26, 2017	#LBGuiltySiCharie	7.1%	#1	
69	Kalbaryo	May 29, 2017	#LBKalbaryo	6.4%	#1	
70	Kasamaan ni Charie	May 30, 2017	#LBKasamaanNiCharie	6.0%	#1	
71	Pagmamanman	May 31, 2017	#LBPagmamanman	6.1%	#1	

=== June 2017 ===
Episode		Original Air Date	Social media hashtag	AGB Nielsen NUTAM People		
Episode		Original Air Date	Social media hashtag	Rating	Timeslot Rank	Ref.
72	Kapatid laban sa Kapatid	June 1, 2017	#LBKapatidLabanSaKapatid	7.3%	#1	
73	Paghihiganti ni Grace	June 2, 2017	#LBPaghihigantiNiGrace	7.8%	#1	
74	Ganti ni Grace	June 5, 2017	#LBGantiNiGrace	6.4%	#1	
75	Welcome Back, Edward	June 6, 2017	#LBWelcomeBackEdward	6.4%	#1	
76	Huli ka, William	June 7, 2017	#LBHuliKaWilliam	6.3%	#1	
77	Grace vs. William	June 8, 2017	#LBGraceVSWilliam	6.4%	#1	
78	Magtago ka na, William	June 9, 2017	#LBMagtagoKaNaWilliam	8.0%	#1	
79	Suspect si Grace	June 12, 2017	#LBSuspectSiGrace	7.0%	#1	
80	Arestado ka, William	June 13, 2017	#LBArestadoKaWilliam	6.5%	#1	
81	Litisin si William	June 14, 2017	#LBLitisinSiWilliam	6.6%	#1	
82	Karma ni Charie	June 15, 2017	#LBKarmaNiCharie	7.1%	#1	
83	Lukaret ka, Charie	June 16, 2017	#LBLukaretKaCharie	6.9%	#1	
84	Hamon kay Grace	June 19, 2017	#LBHamonKayGrace	5.8%	#1	
85	Laban pa, Grace	June 20, 2017	#LBLabanPaGrace	5.7%	#1	
86	Banta ni Grace	June 21, 2017	#LBBantaNiGrace	6.2%	#1	
87	Agawan sa Ina	June 22, 2017	#LBAgawanSaIna	6.5%	#1	
88	Laban kung Laban	June 23, 2017	#LBLabanKungLaban	7.0%	#1	
89	Pasabog	June 26, 2017	#LBPasabog	7.7%	#1	
90	Huwag Kang Sumuko, Grace	June 27, 2017	#LBHuwagKangSumukoGrace	6.7%	#1	
91	Huling Pagtutos	June 28, 2017	#LBHulingPagtutos	6.3%	#1	
92	Walang Atrasan	June 29, 2017	#LBWalangAtrasan	6.2%	#1	
93	The Final Judgement	June 30, 2017	#LBFinalJudgement	6.2%	#1	
