= The Last Judgment (Bosch, Munich) =

Triptych by Hieronymus Bosch

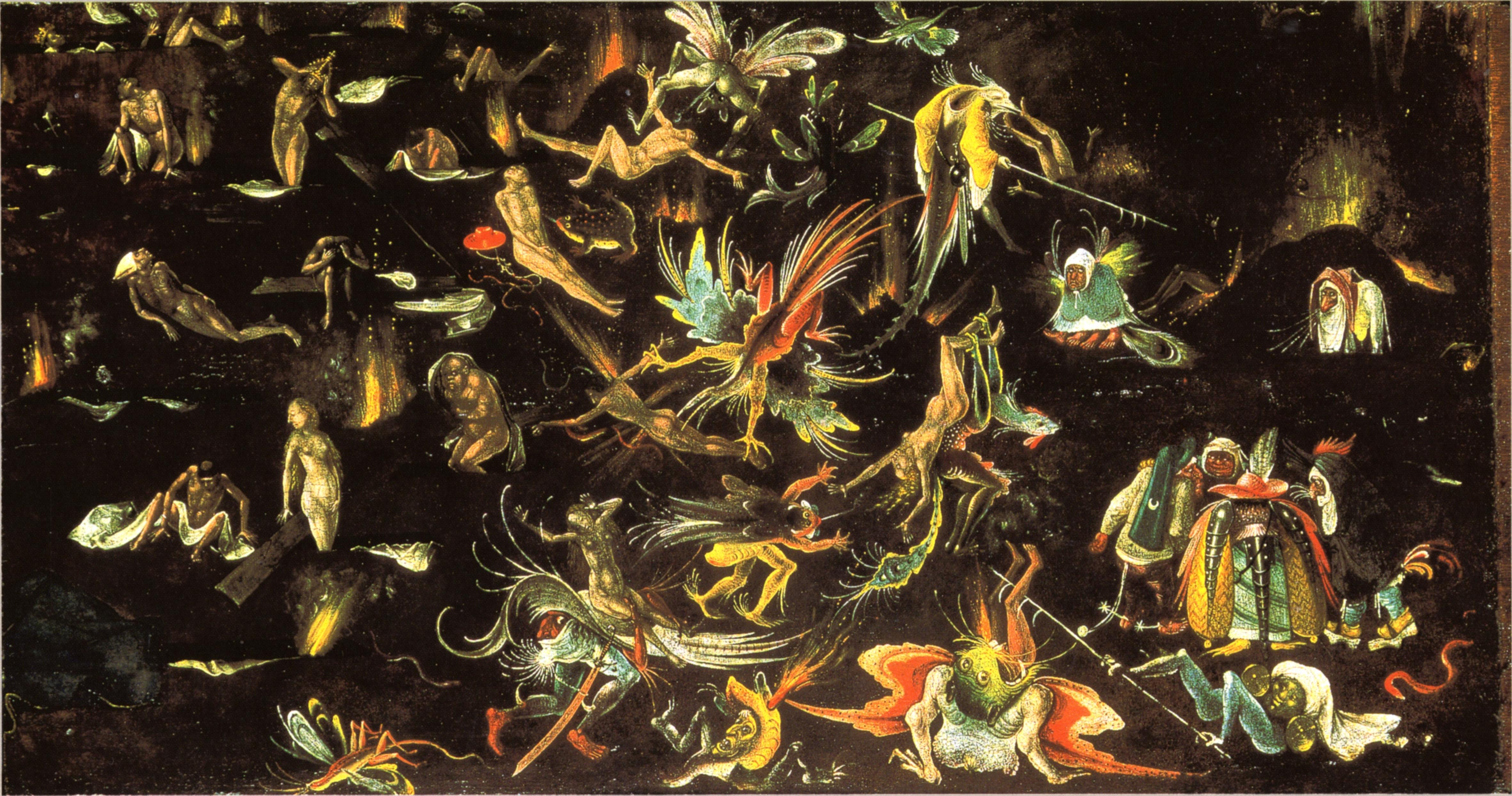
- Artist: Hieronymus Bosch
- Year: c. 1506-1508
- Medium: Oil on wood
- Dimensions: 60 cm × 114 cm (24 in × 45 in)
- Location: Alte Pinakothek, Munich

The Last Judgment is a triptych created by a follower of Hieronymus Bosch. Unlike the other two triptychs with the same name, in Vienna and in Bruges, only a fragment of this one exists today. It resides at the Alte Pinakothek in Munich.

After being damaged, this fragment was heavily repainted, then the paint was removed in 1936.
