= Ship of Fools (painting) =

Painting by Hieronymus Bosch

The Ship of Fools
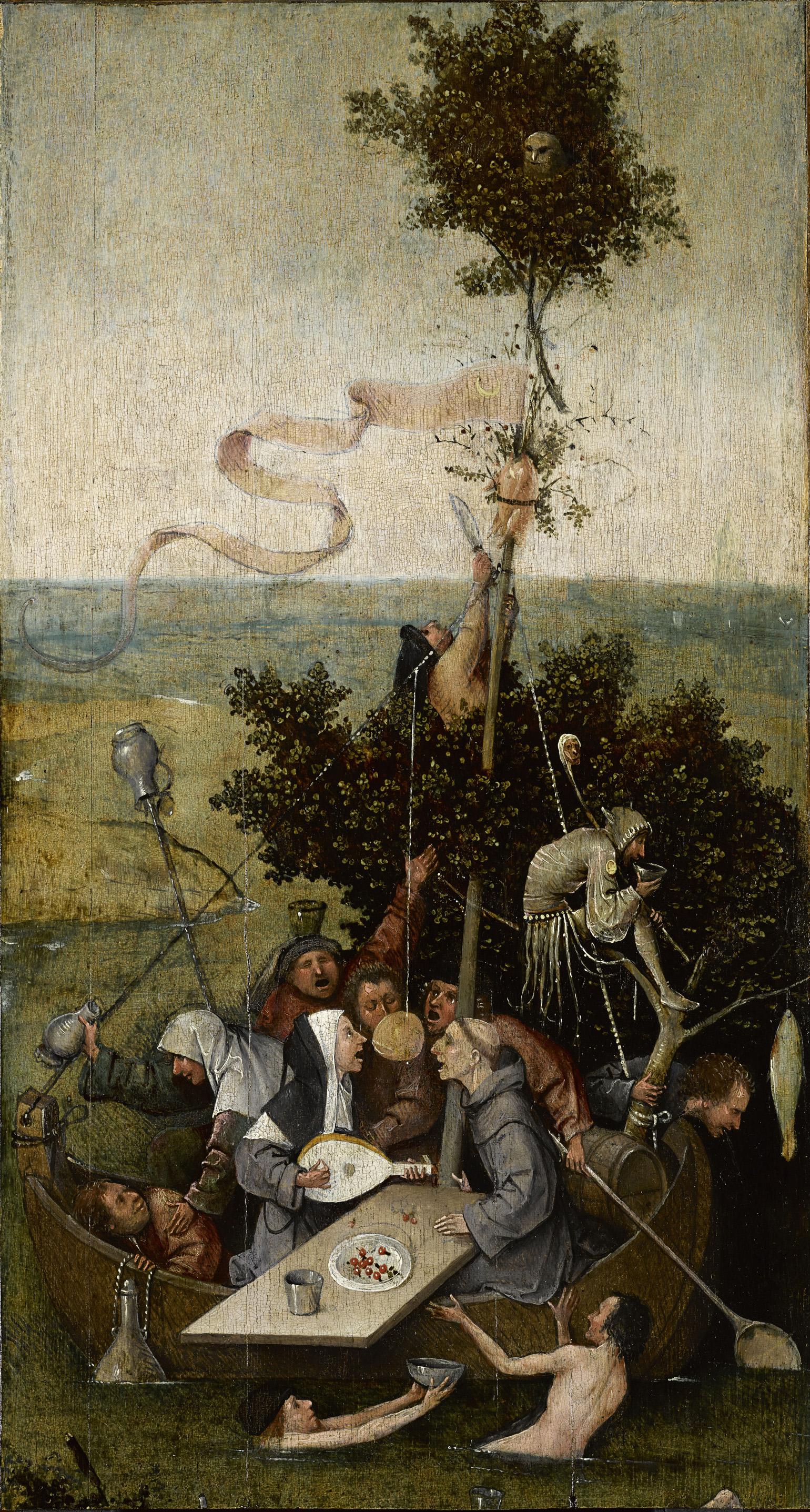
- Artist: Hieronymus Bosch
- Year: c. 1490–1500
- Medium: Oil on wood
- Dimensions: 58 cm × 33 cm (22.8 in × 13.0 in)
- Location: Louvre; Paris

Ship of Fools (painted c. 1490–1500) is a painting by the Early Netherlandish artist Hieronymus Bosch (d. 1515), now in the Musée du Louvre, Paris. Camille Benoit donated it in 1918. The Louvre restored it in 2015.

The surviving painting is a fragment of a triptych that was cut into several parts. This piece, originally part of a larger body of work relating to the seven deadly sins, depicts the sin of gluttony. The Ship of Fools was painted on one of the wings of the altarpiece, and is about two-thirds of its original length. The bottom third of the panel belongs to Yale University Art Gallery and is exhibited under the title Allegory of Gluttony. The other wing, which has more or less retained its full length, is the Death and the Miser, now in the National Gallery of Art, Washington, D.C. The two panels together would have represented the two extremes of prodigality and miserliness, condemning and caricaturing both. The Wayfarer (Rotterdam) was painted on the right panel rear of the triptych. The central panel, if it existed, is unknown.

The Ship of fools is a trope going back to classical times, first recorded as allegory, in Book VI of Plato's Republic, about a ship with a dysfunctional crew. It received a considerable boost in popularity after Sebastian Brant published his satire Das Narrenschiff ("Ship of Fools") in 1493.

== Dating/provenance ==
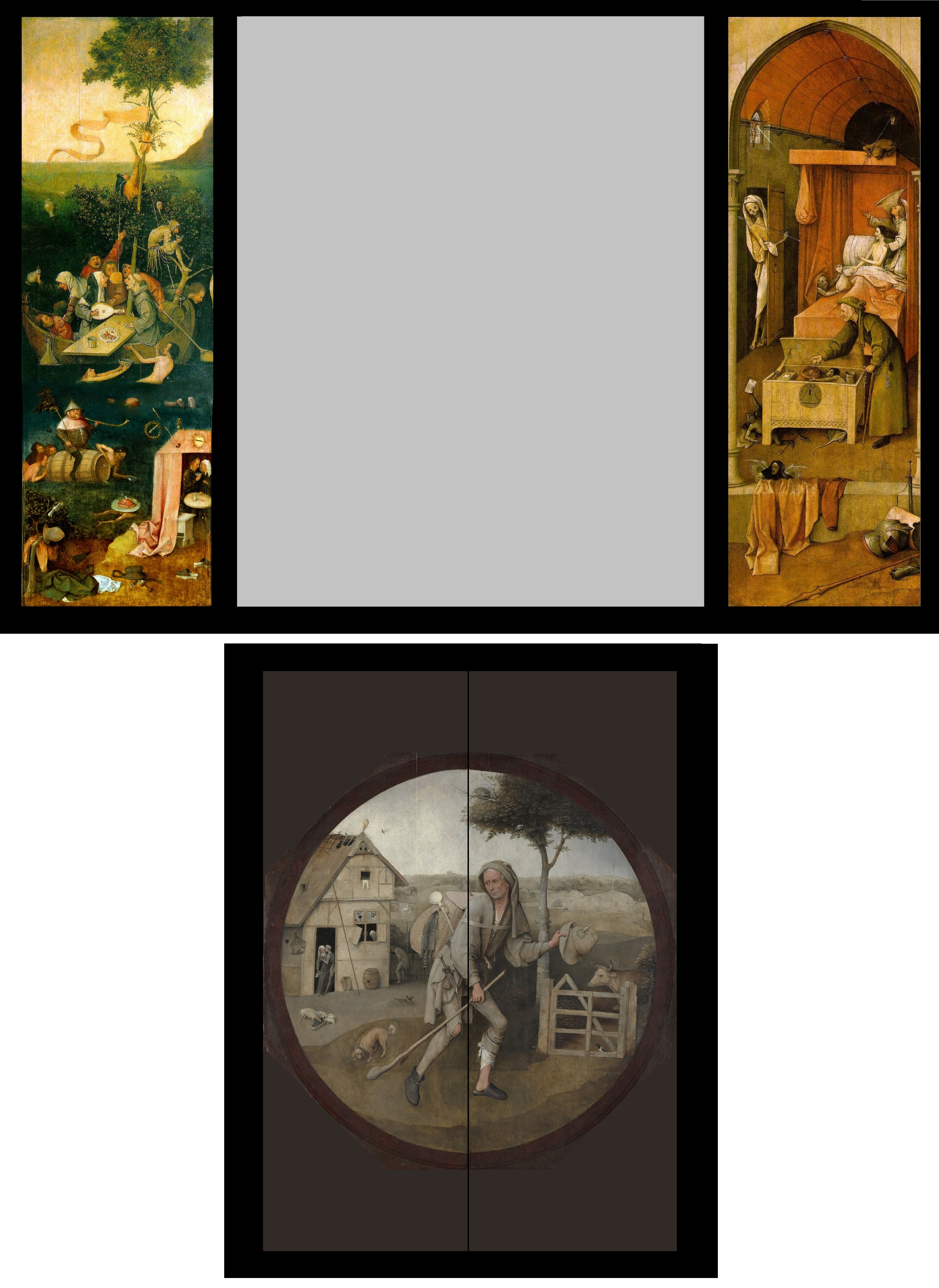
A reconstruction of the left and right wings of the triptych: at upper left The Ship of Fools (before restoration); at lower left: Allegory of Gluttony and Lust. Panel at right is Death and the Miser. At bottom "The Wayfarer" which would have been on the outside of the triptych.

Dendrochronological study has dated the wood to 1491 (after which an extended period of seasoning would be normal), and it is tempting to see the painting as a response to Sebastian Brant's Das Narrenschiff or even the illustrations of the first edition of 1493. Another possible source for the ship allegory is the 14th-century Le Pèlerinage de l'Âme by Guillaume de Deguileville, which was printed in Dutch in 1486 (shortly after William Caxton printed it as The Pylgremage of the Sowle in 1483).

A Drawing of the Ship of Fools, also in the Louvre, appears to be a later copy.

Dendrochronological studies by Peter Klein have radically altered the provenance of some paintings, for instance the Escorial Crowning with Thorns panel can only have been painted after 1525 and so is not a Bosch original. The same goes for the Rotterdam Marriage feast at Cana panel which can only have been painted after 1553. It has also become clear that the Rotterdam Pedlar tondo, the Paris Ship of Fools panel and the Washington Death of a Miser panel have been painted on wood from the same tree.

The two to eight years between the felling of the tree and its use as a painting substrate allows The Ship of Fools to be a direct satire of a frontispiece of Sebastian Brant's book.

== See also ==
- List of paintings by Hieronymus Bosch
- The Tricks of Leonardo da Vinci & Hieronymus Bosch. Xavier d'Hérouville & Aurore Caulier. December 2023. HAL Open Science
