= Holy Allegory =

Painting by Giovanni Bellini

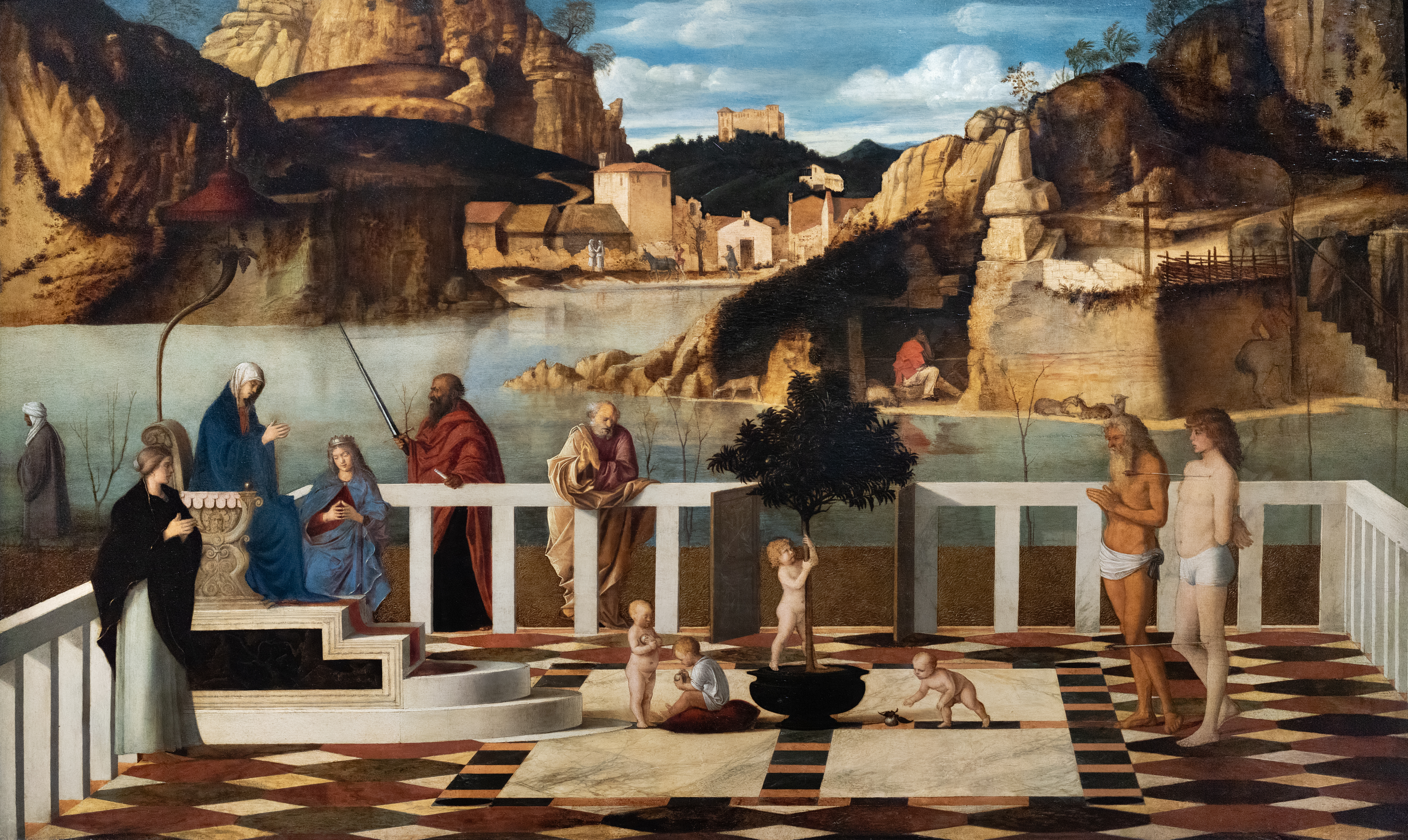
- Artist: Giovanni Bellini
- Year: c. 1490–1500
- Medium: oil on wood
- Dimensions: 73 cm × 119 cm (29 in × 47 in)
- Location: Uffizi; Florence

The Holy Allegory is a painting by the Italian Renaissance master Giovanni Bellini, dating from c. 1490 to 1500. It is in the Uffizi gallery in Florence, Italy.

== History ==
There is no documentation about the commission and the original location of the work, which is known to have been part of the Austrian Imperial collections in Vienna in the 18th century. In 1793 the director of the Uffizi, Luigi Lanzi, exchanged it with another work in order to improve the Venetian Renaissance presence in the museum. At the time, it was attributed to Giorgione.

The Italian art historian Giovanni Battista Cavalcaselle was the first to identify it as a Bellini. Today his attribution is widely recognized, although another name sometimes mentioned is that of Marco Basaiti.

== Description ==
The scene is set on a wide terrace with a polychrome marble pavement, in perspective, separated from a lake shore by a parapet. On the left Mary is enthroned, under a baldachin whose support is in cornucopia shape, a symbol of her fertility. The baldachin has four steps, and on its side is a frieze with scenes of the myth of Marsyas, interpreted as a parallel with Jesus' Passion. Near to Mary are two unidentified female figures, which could represent two saints or two virtues. One of them looks to be floating in the air, although the effect could stem from a loss of color near her legs and feet.

In the middle of the scene are four children playing with a small tree and its silver fruits, perhaps a symbol of the knowledge tree, a symbol of life and wisdom. On the right are Job and St. Sebastian. Outside the parapet, are St. Joseph (or St. Peter) and St. Paul, the latter with his attribute of a sword. He is advancing to the left, where a man with a turban perhaps symbolizes an infidel.

In the background, beyond a large lake, is a landscape with rocky spurs with men and animals. On the shores are a shepherd in a grotto, and a centaur.

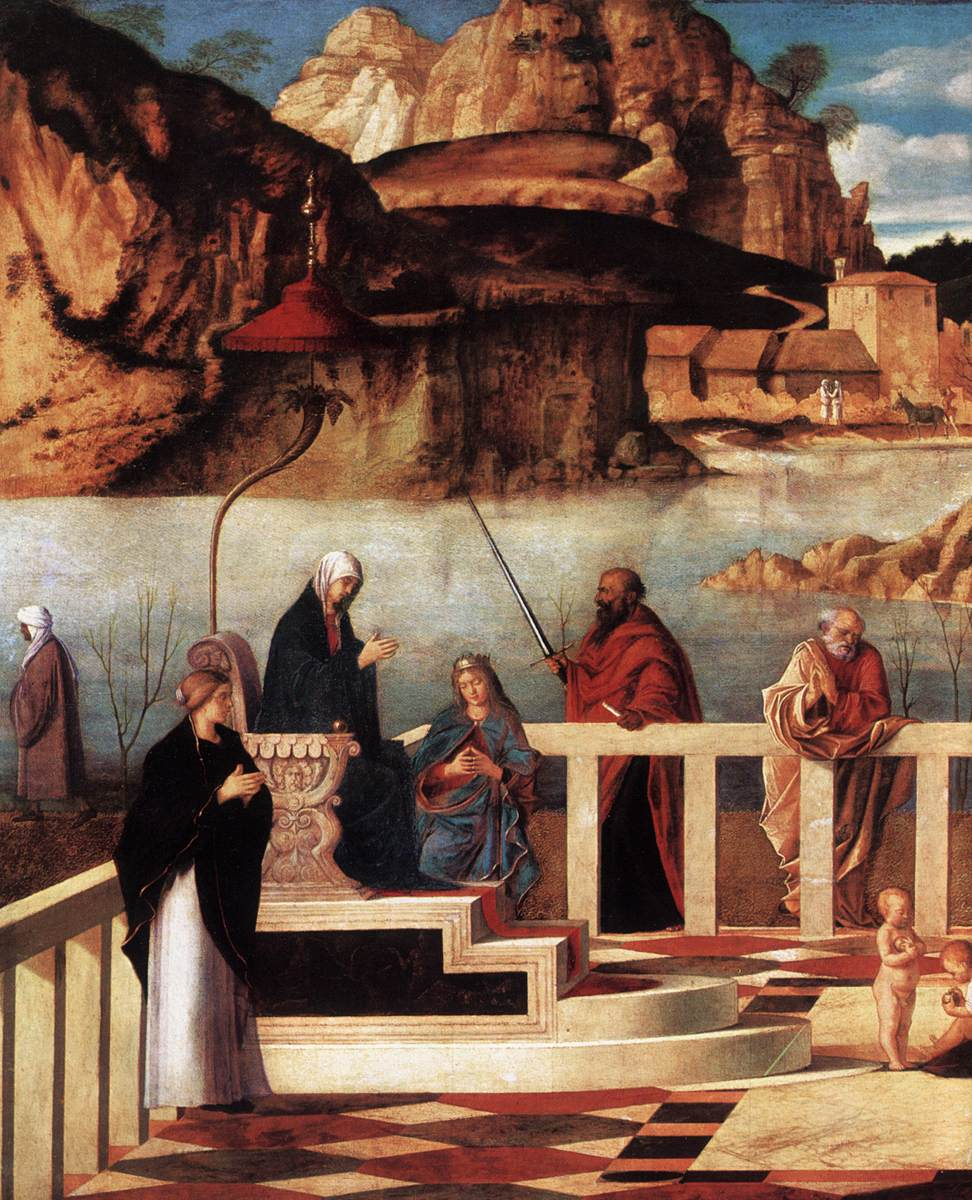
Detail.

== Interpretations ==
The exact meaning of the painting had not been yet completely understood, although several hypotheses have been made by art historians. What is sure is that the painting was made for a refined élite, whose education allowed them to understand any subtle detail included in it.

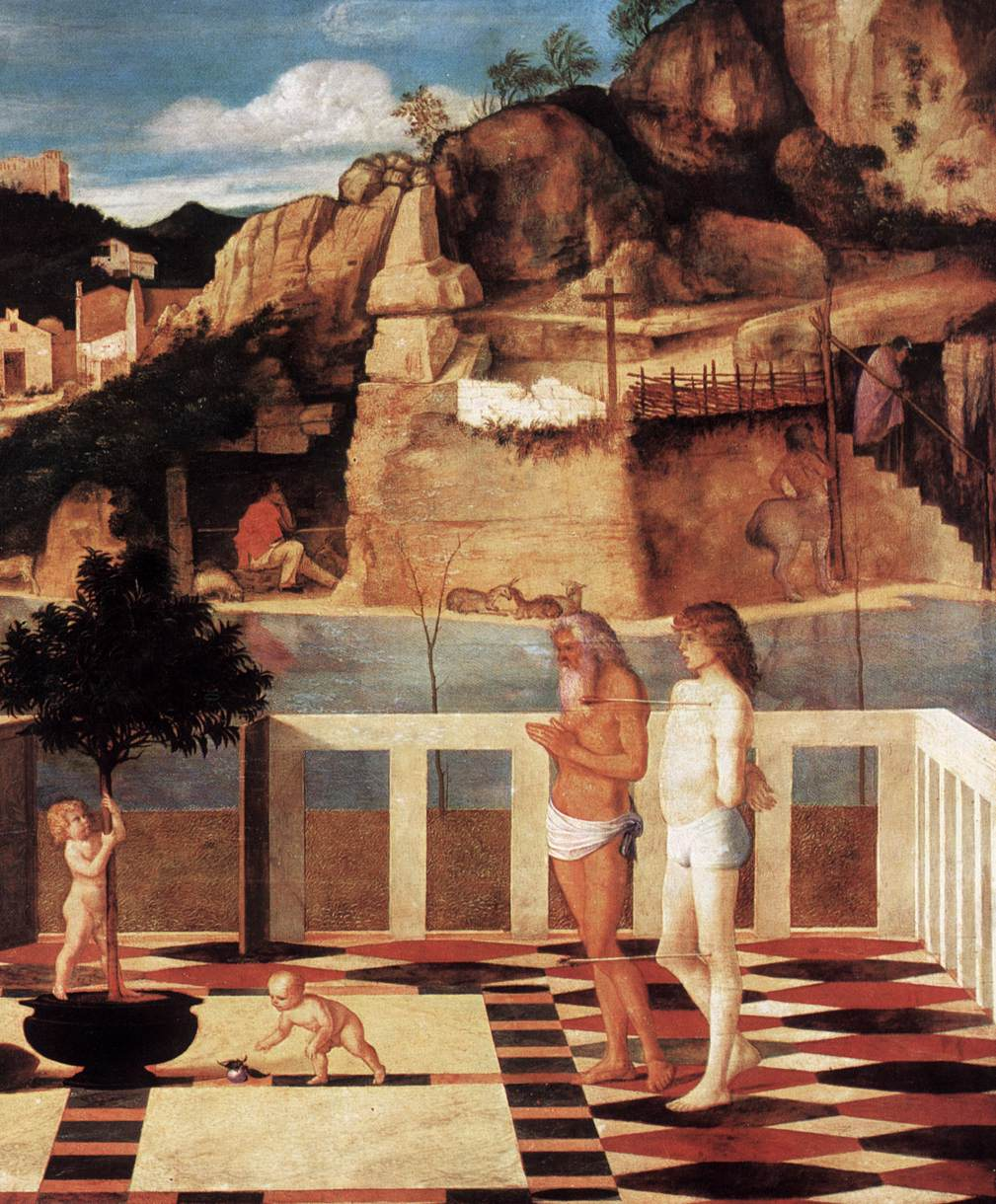
Detail.

In the early 20th century, Ludwig interpreted it as a pictorial transcription of the early 14th century French poem Le Pèlerinage de l'Âme ("Pilgrimage of the Soul"), by Guillaume de Deguileville. According to him, the painting represents the ideal path of purification of the soul. The hermit shepherd would be St. Anthony the Abbot, descending from his hermitage in the spiritual path inspired to the first hermit, St. Paul, and overcoming several obstacles including the centaur which waits for him at the end of the staircase. The terrace would represent the Paradise Garden, where the souls in Purgatory, symbolized by the children, wait before they are admitted to heaven. Mary, advocate of the men before God, judges the souls with the help of the crowned Justice coronata. Amongst the children, who are playing with the mystic fruits, the one at the tree would be a soul called to the eternal beatitude. The two saints standing on the left would be the patrons, perhaps connected to the works' commissioners, while the two behind the parapet would be Peter and Paul, who guard the gate of Paradise. The river in the background would be Lethe, which surrounds Paradise. The animals would represent the hermits' virtue: the mule for the patience, and the sheep for humility.

According to other scholars, the painting would represent a common holy conversation or a vision of the Paradise. Some see Jesus in the children on the cushion, giving to the work the meaning of a meditation about incarnation and redemption.

== See also ==
- List of works by Giovanni Bellini

== Sources ==
- Olivari, Mariolina (2007). "Giovanni Bellini". Pittori del Rinascimento. Florence: Scala. ISBN 978-88-8117-099-9.
- Galleria degli Uffizi. Rome. 2003.
