= Tim Storrier =

Australian artist

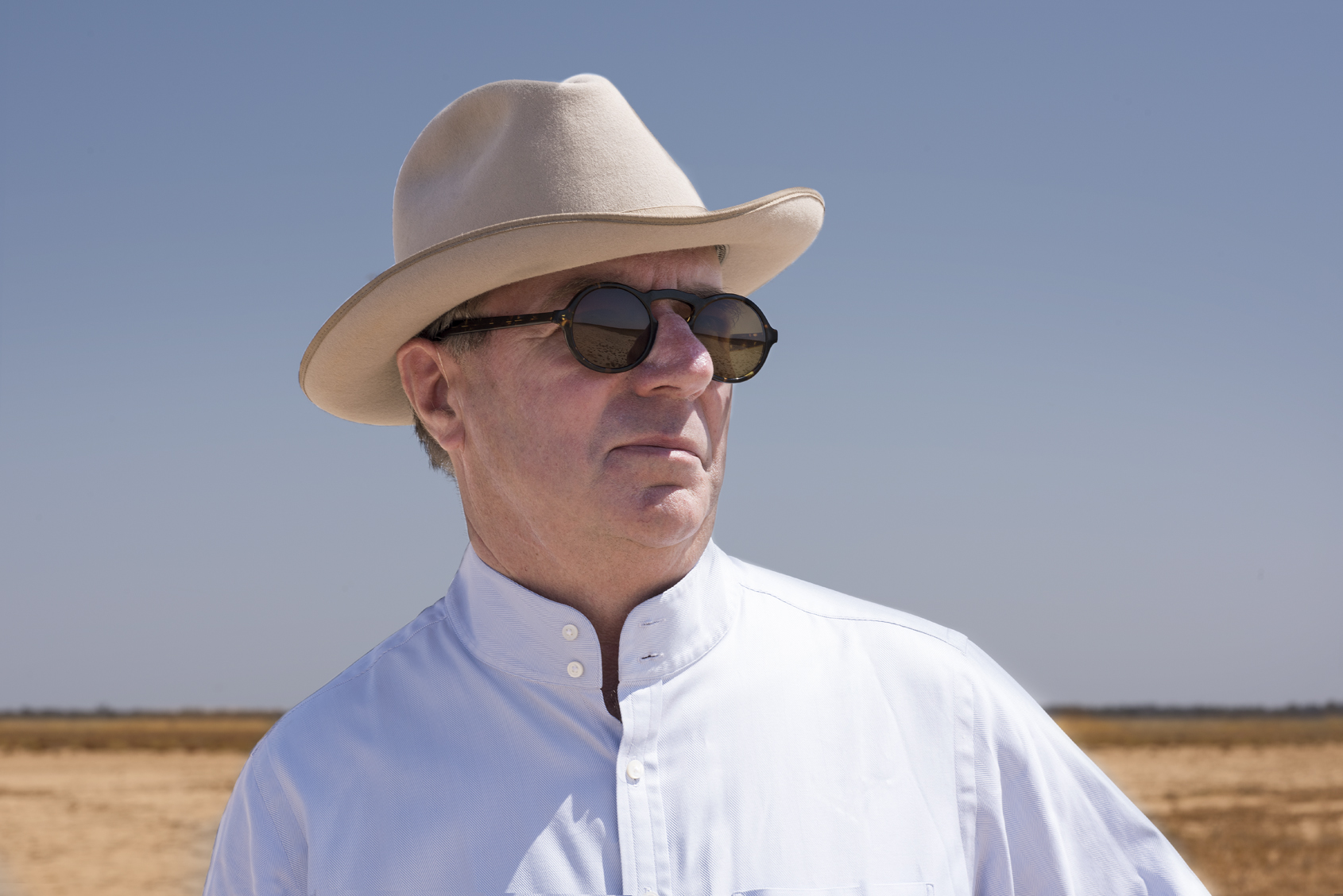
- Storrier in Brewarrina, 2015 by Gary Grealy
- Born: 13 February 1949 (age 77); Sydney, New South Wales, Australia
- Education: National Art School, Sydney
- Known for: Painting
- Awards: Sir John Sulman Prize; 1968 Suzy 350 Sir John Sulman Prize; 1984 The Burn Archibald Prize; 2012 The Histrionic Wayfarer (after Bosch) Doug Moran National Portrait Prize; 2017 The Lunar Savant
- Website: storrier.com

Tim Storrier AM (born 13 February 1949, Sydney) is an Australian artist who won the 2017 Doug Moran National Portrait Prize with The Lunar Savant, a portrait of fellow artist McLean Edwards.

Storrier won the 2012 Archibald Prize for a 'faceless' self-portrait entitled The Histrionic Wayfarer (after Bosch). His win proved a controversial choice by the judges. Storrier noted in the accompanying Art Gallery of New South Wales (AGNSW) text "It refers to a painting by Hieronymus Bosch called The Wayfarer painted in c. 1510 where the figure is believed to be choosing a path or possibly the prodigal son returning ... It also has other references, I believe, but they are rather clouded in biblical history and time ... A carapace of burden is depicted in [...] The histrionic wayfarer, clothed in the tools to sustain the intrigue of a metaphysical survey. Provisions, art materials, books, papers, bedding, compass and maps, all for the journey through the landscape of the artist's mind, accompanied by Smudge [the dog], the critic and guide of the whole enterprise", said Storrier.

The AGNSW text notes, "Though there is no face to identify him, Storrier believes that identity is made clear by the clothes and equipment carried. Storrier has included a drawing of himself in the painting, scribbled on a piece of paper being blown away by the wind". Storrier's "Wayfarer" is one of his later career figurative subjects and other examples can be seen in his In Absentia series.

== Personal life ==
Storrier grew up near Wellington, New South Wales, was educated at the Sydney Church of England Grammar School (Shore) and the National Art School, in Sydney. Storrier lived and worked in Sydney until 1995 when he moved to Bathurst, New South Wales, where he remained until 2013. He and his third wife Janet reside near Bowral in NSW.

== Awards ==
He is the recipient of several awards including the Sir John Sulman Prize in 1968 for Suzy 350 at age 19 and again in 1984 for The Burn and the Archibald Prize in 2012 for The Histrionic Wayfarer (after Bosch). At nineteen, Storrier was the youngest artist to win the Sulman Prize. He was a finalist in the 2011 Archibald Prize and also in the Wynne Prize 2012 for his painting The Dalliance. He was the winner of the 2014 Packing Room Prize.

== Documentary ==
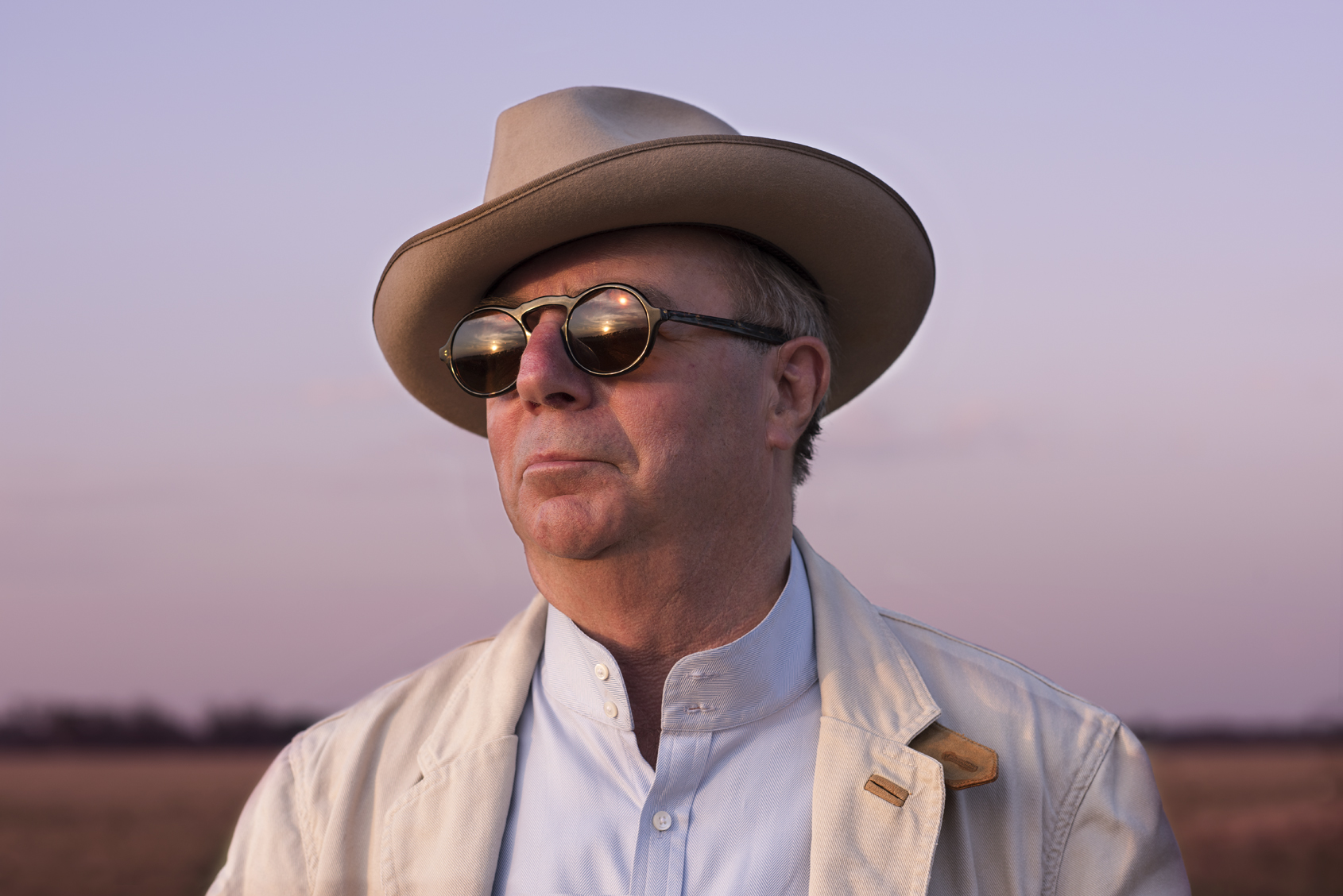
Tim Storrier in Brewarrina by Gary Grealy, 2015

In 1993, Storrier was the subject of the documentary film Lighting Fires which aired on ABC television. In 1994, he was awarded an Order of Australia (AM) for services to art.

== Museums ==
His work is included in the collections of the National Gallery of Australia, the Art Gallery of New South Wales, the Metropolitan Museum of Art in New York and all major Australian art museums.

== Publications ==
- Capon, Edmund; Wright, William; Storrier, Tim; Zimmer, Jenny; Macmillan, Melbourne (2009). Moments.
- Crawford, Ashley (2003). Lines of Fire: Works on Paper by Tim Storrier. Melbourne: Thames and Hudson.
- McGregor, Ken; Crawford, Ashley (2002). William Creek & Beyond: Australian Artists Explore the Outback. Sydney: Craftsman House.
- Lumby, Catharine (2000). Tim Storrier: The Art of the Outsider. Sydney: Craftsman House.
- Gray, Robert, ed. (1998). John Olsen: Drawn from Life. Sydney: Duffy & Snellgrove.
- Allen, Christopher (1997). Art in Australia: From Colonization to Postmodernism. London: Thames & Hudson.
- Hawley, Janet (1993). 'Tim Storrier', in Encounters with Australian Artists. St Lucia: University of Queensland Press. pp. 147–55.
- Van Nunen, Linda (1987). Point to Point: The Art of Tim Storrier. Sydney: Craftsman House.
- McKenzie, Janet (1986). Drawing in Australia: Contemporary Images and Ideas. Melbourne: Macmillan Australia.
- Germaine, Max (1979). Artists and Galleries of Australia and New Zealand. Sydney: Lansdowne Editions.
- Hughes, Robert (1970). The Art of Australia (revised ed.). Melbourne: Penguin Books.

=== Essays and editorials ===
- Tim Storrier (London exhibition) – Bryan Robertson, Fischer Fine Art, London, 1983
- Ticket to Egypt – Linda Van Nunen and Christopher Leonard, Art Gallery of New South Wales, Sydney, 1986
- Burning of the Gifts – Deborah Hart, Australian Galleries, Sydney, 1989
- Point to Point – William Wright, Presentation of major work to Australian Embassy, Tokyo, 1996

== See also ==
- List of Archibald Prize winners
- List of Archibald Prize 2012 finalists

Awards
Preceded by Ben Quilty	Archibald Prize; 2012 for The histrionic wayfarer (after Bosch)	Succeeded by Del Kathryn Barton
