= The Haywain Triptych =

Panel painting by Hieronymus Bosch

- Artist: Hieronymus Bosch
- Year: c. 1516
- Medium: oil on oak panels
- Dimensions: 135 cm × 200 cm (53 in × 79 in)
- Location: Museo del Prado, Madrid

The Haywain Triptych is a panel painting by the Early Netherlandish painter Hieronymus Bosch, now in the Museo del Prado, Madrid, Spain. A date of around 1516 has been established by means of dendrochronological research. The central panel, signed "Jheronimus Bosch", measures 135 cm × 200 cm (53 in × 79 in) and the wings measure 147 cm × 66 cm (58 in × 26 in). The outside shutters feature a full color version of Bosch's The Wayfarer.

== History ==
The painting was part of a group of six acquired by King Philip II of Spain in 1570, and shipped to El Escorial four years later. It was later sold to the Marquis of Salamanca, and divided into three paintings. In 1848, the central panel was bought by Isabella II of Spain and brought to Aranjuez, the right one was returned to Escorial and the left went to the Prado. The triptych was finally recomposed in 1914 in the latter museum. A copy exists at the Escorial.

== Description ==
=== Main panels ===
Left panel: The Garden of Eden

Center panel: The Hay Wagon

Right panel: Hell

The Haywain triptych follows a similar narrative to The Garden of Earthly Delights. The left panel shows God giving form to Eve. Unlike the Garden, though, a narrative sequence flows through the panel in different scenes. At the top, the rebel angels are cast out of Heaven while God sits enthroned, the angels turning into insects as they break through the clouds. Below this, God creates Eve from the rib of Adam. Next, Adam and Eve find the serpent and the tree; the serpent offers them an apple. Finally, at the lowest part of the panel, the angel, dressed in Cope and alb, forces the two out of the Garden of Eden. Adam speaks with the angel; Eve, in a melancholic pose, looks ahead to the right.

The central panel features a large wagon of hay surrounded by a multitude of fools engaged in a variety of sins, quite apart from the sins of lust which dominates the Garden of Earthly Delights. In the center panel Bosch shows Christ in the sky, not paralleled in the Garden. An angel on top of the wagon looks to the sky, praying, but none of the other figures see Christ looking down on the world. The rightward bow of the figures around the wagon provides the force for the viewer's eye to move with them on their journey and the cart is drawn by infernal beings which drag everyone to Hell, depicted on the right panel.

The forward kinetic motion of the participants moves the viewer from present-day sin into unadulterated torture in the realms of Hell. The procession on the left side of this panel bends back into the middle ground, but the right side figures continue in a straight line with the wagon, a more evident progress into damnation.

=== Shutters ===
'The Pedlar'

The exterior of the shutters, like most contemporary Netherlandish triptychs, was also painted, although in this case Bosch used full colors instead of the usual grisaille. When closed, they form a single scene depicting a wayfarer or a pedlar similar to Bosch's c. 1500 work The Wayfarer. Around him is a series of miniatures including the robbery of another wayfarer and a hanged man. The man uses a stick to repel a dog.

According to the most recent interpretations, this figure may represent the man who follows his road in spite of the temptation of sins (such as lust, perhaps symbolized by the two dancing shepherds) and the evil acts occurring around him.

== Painting materials ==
The triptych was thoroughly investigated by the scientists at the Bosch Research and Conservation Project with the results published in book form. Bosch's palette was rather limited with pigments including azurite, lead-tin yellow, vermilion and ochres.

== See also ==
- List of paintings by Hieronymus Bosch
