= The Wayfarer (painting) =

Painting by Hieronymus Bosch

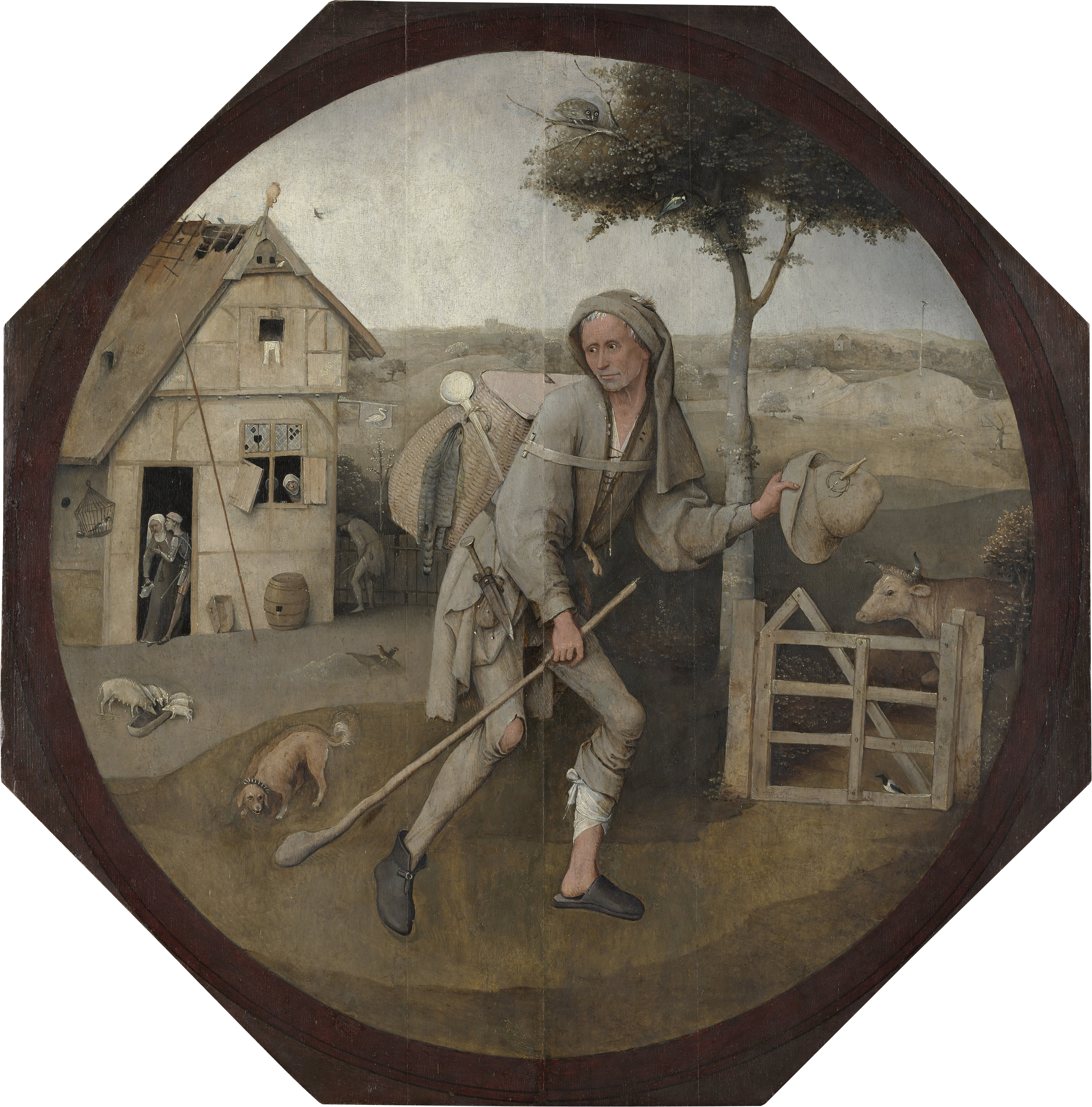
- Artist: Hieronymus Bosch
- Year: c. 1500
- Medium: oil on panel
- Dimensions: 71 cm × 70.6 cm (28 in × 27.8 in); 71.5 cm diameter (28.1 in)
- Location: Museum Boijmans Van Beuningen; Rotterdam

The Wayfarer (or The Pedlar) is an oil-on-panel painting by the Early Netherlandish artist Hieronymus Bosch, created c. 1500. It is now in Museum Boijmans Van Beuningen in Rotterdam. This painting is round and 71.5 cm (28.1 in) in diameter. It is one of the fragments of a partially lost triptych or diptych, which also included the Allegory of Gluttony and Lust, the Ship of Fools and Death and the Miser.

The figure is similar to the man depicted in The Path of Life panel on the exterior of The Haywain Triptych. The character has been interpreted as choosing between the path of virtue at the gate on the right or debauchery in the house on the left, or as the prodigal son returning home from the world.

== Legacy ==
Tim Storrier's self-portrait The Histrionic Wayfarer (after Bosch) won the 2012 Archibald Prize.

== See also ==
- List of paintings by Hieronymus Bosch
