= Allegory of Intemperance =

Painting by Hieronymus Bosch

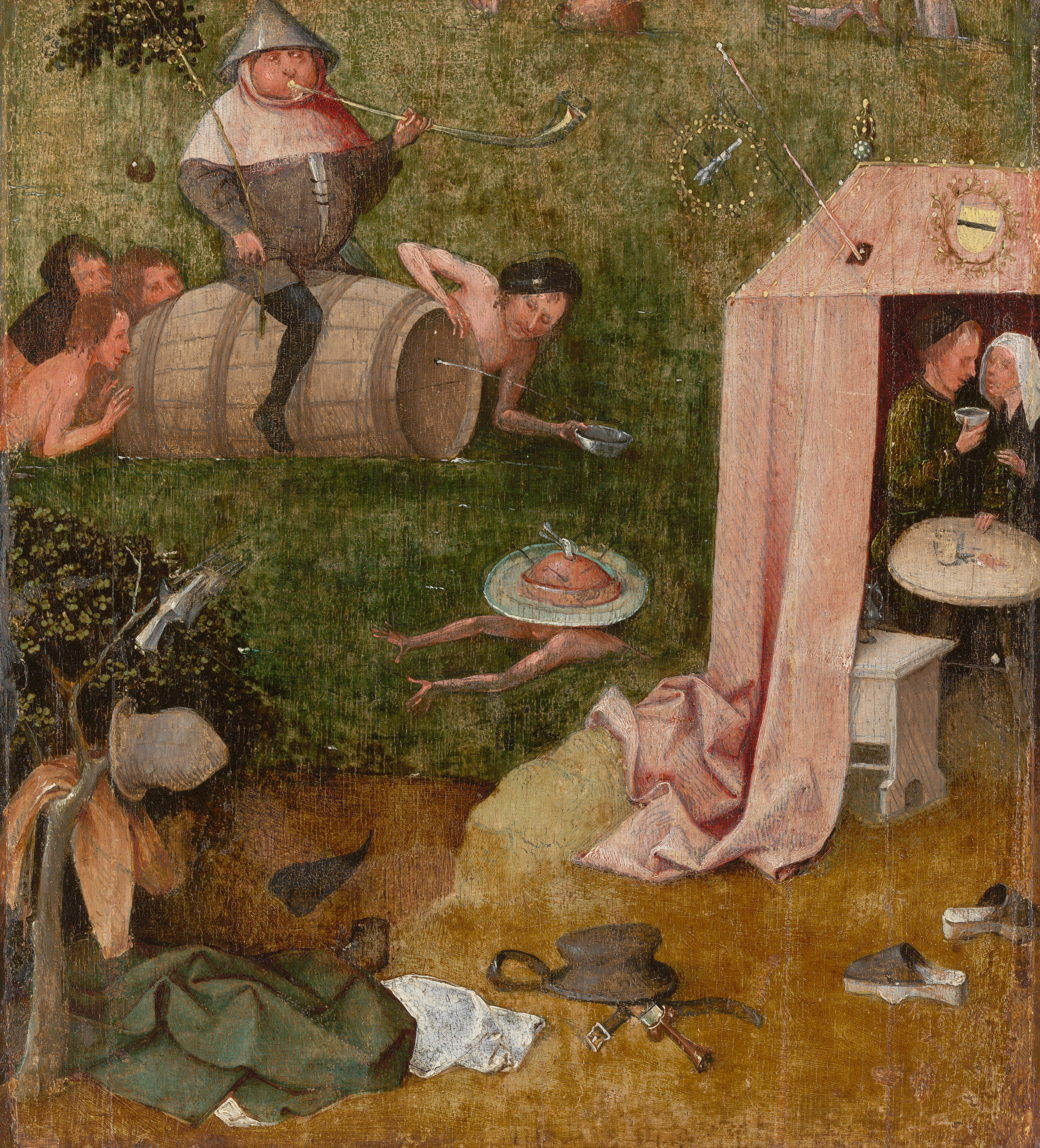
- Artist: Hieronymus Bosch
- Year: c. 1490-1500
- Medium: Oil on wood
- Dimensions: 35.9 cm × 31.4 cm (14.1 in × 12.4 in)
- Location: Yale University Art Gallery; New Haven

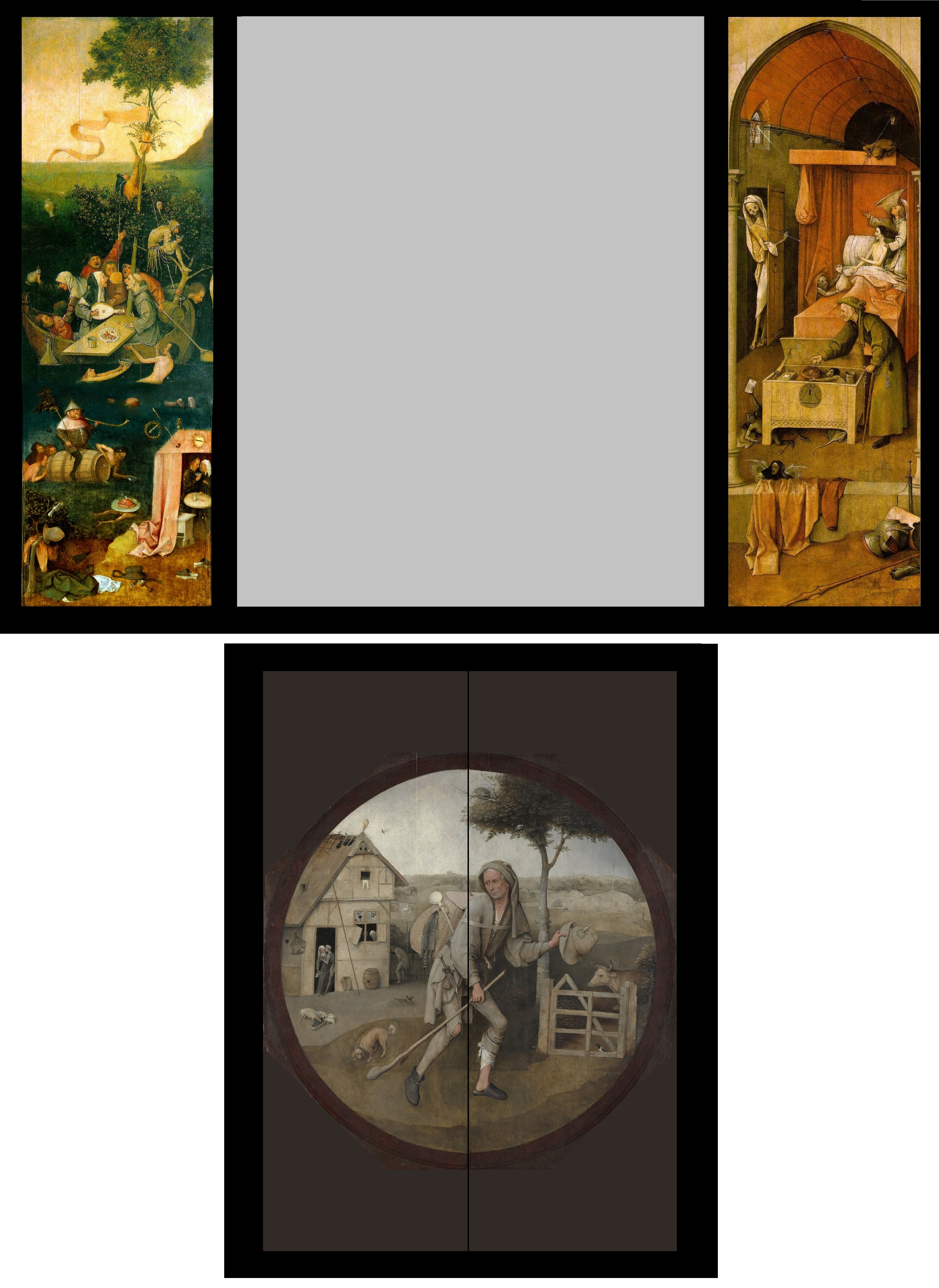
A reconstruction of the left and right wings of the triptych: at upper left The Ship of Fools; at lower left: Allegory of Gluttony and Lust. Panel at right is Death and the Miser. At bottom "The Wayfarer" which would have been on the outside of the triptych.

Allegory of Intemperance is an oil on wood painting by the Dutch artist Hieronymus Bosch made c. 1490–1500. It is held in the Yale University Art Gallery, in New Haven, Connecticut.

This panel is the left inside bottom wing of a hinged triptych. The other identified parts are The Ship of Fools, which formed the upper left panel, and the Death and the Miser, which was the right panel; The Wayfarer was painted on the right panel rear. The central panel, if it existed, is unknown.

The Allegory represented a condemnation of gluttony, in the same way the right panel condemned avarice. The fragment shows a fat man riding a barrel in a kind of lake or pool. He is surrounded by other people, who push him or pour a liquid from the barrel. Below, a man swims with, above his head, a vessel with meat. The swimmer's clothes lie on the shore at bottom. On the right, under a hut, a couple is devoted to lascivious acts, perhaps induced by drunkenness.

== See also ==
- List of paintings by Hieronymus Bosch
