= Death and the Miser =

Painting by Hieronymus Bosch

- Artist: Hieronymus Bosch
- Year: 1490–1516
- Dimensions: 93 cm × 31 cm (37 in × 12 in)
- Location: National Gallery of Art, Washington, D.C.
- Accession: 1952.5.33

Death and the Miser (also known as Death of the Usurer) is a Northern Renaissance painting produced between 1490 and 1516 by the Dutch artist Hieronymus Bosch. The piece was originally part of a triptych, but the center piece is missing. It is a memento mori painting, which is meant to remind the viewer of the inevitability of death and the futility of the pursuit of material wealth, illustrating the sin of greed.

There is still debate about the exact symbolism of the man and the objects in the foreground. Bosch was influenced by the Ars moriendi, religious texts that instructed Christians how to live and die. It is now in the National Gallery of Art in Washington, D.C.

It measures 93 x 31 cm (36 5/8 x 12 3/16 in) overall, and as framed 105.9 x 43.5 x 5.4 cm (41 11/16 x 17 1/8 x 2 1/8 in).

== Description ==
Death and the Miser belongs to the tradition of memento mori, a term that describes works of art that remind the viewer of the inevitability of death. The painting shows the influence of popular 15th-century handbooks (including text and woodcuts) on the "Art of Dying Well" (Ars moriendi), intended to help Christians choose Christ over earthly and sinful pleasures.

The scene takes place in a narrow, vaulted room that holds a man on his deathbed, similar to the unclothed, thin, and sickly representation of souls in other Bosch triptychs. The skeletal figure of Death emerges from a closet on the left with an arrow pointed at the dying man. An angel lays a hand on the man's shoulder, with a hand outstretched to the ray of light emanating from the window on the left, where a small crucifix also hangs. There is a nefarious creature holding a lantern peeking down from the canopy of the bed, while a "devil" offers the man a large sack of coin. These fantasy type creatures can be seen in many of Bosch's other paintings, most famously The Garden of Earthly Delights.

In the foreground, an old man dressed in green deposits coins into the sack of a demon in the trunk while gripping his cane and rosary in his left hand. The trunk contains worldly possessions: a knife, money, armor, a gold weight (that looks similar to a chess pawn), and envelopes, notes, or letters. Discarded garments and a winged demon figure are closer in the foreground, with other weapons and pieces of the suit of armor. The room is seen through a pointed archway flanked with columns, but the foreground appears to be outdoors. It is unknown what sort of structure the room is attached to, if any.

== Subject and interpretation ==
Death and the Miser combines different timelines into a single scene. It depicts the final moments of man called a miser, a hoarder of wealth, or an usurer, who gives loans while profiting from an often unfair interest rate. It's widely accepted that the old man in green is a slightly younger version of the miser, in full health, storing gold in his money chest (which abounds with demons) while clutching his rosary, indicating both his desire for piety and wealth.

Usury was considered immoral and a great sin (a "sin against justice") in the early Renaissance period, mentioned specifically in the Bible in Luke 6:35, where Christ recommends free lending rather than profiting from the issuance of a loan. Medieval Church law followed these instructions and denounced usury as a practice and excommunicated members for it until the Council of 1516 passed montes pietatis (mount of piety), which stated that charitable institutions were allowed to issue low interest rate loans to the poor. This law implies that usury was not often practiced, but the opposite is true, and many people, poor and well-to-do alike, could not survive without a loan at some point in their lives. It became so common that authorities developed a modus vivendi, or agreement to peaceful coexistence, with pawnbrokers, then known as lombards (named after the region of their origin). It became so common and legal that they were regulated by authorities until a more fair and stable public loan policy was established in 1618.

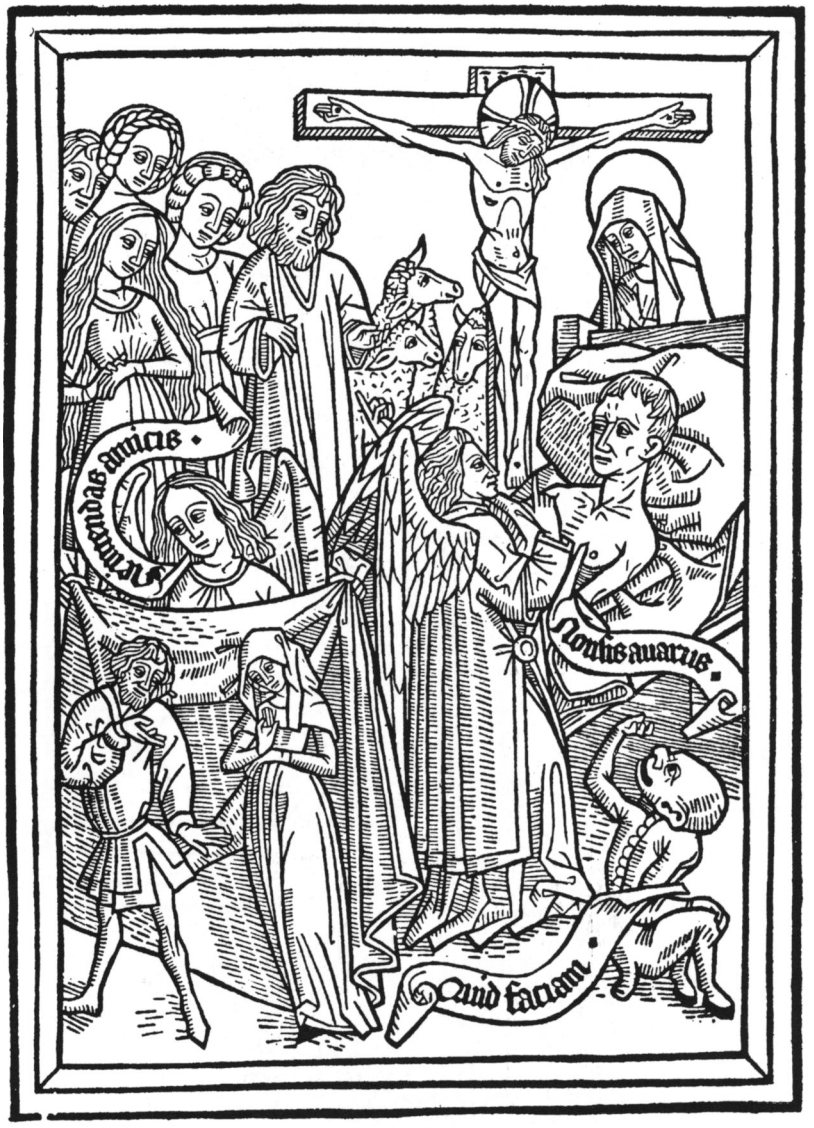
"Bona inspiratio angeli contra avariciam", Cologne, woodcut from Ars moriendi, chapter 10, c. 1450.

The scene is highly reminiscent of an earlier illustration in the Ars moriendi where a dying man is cautioned about his avarice in chapters nine and ten of the book. In chapter nine, the man is tempted by avarice (greed) upon his deathbed, with his wealth shown by expensive treasures, similar to the trunk at the foot of the bed in Bosch's painting. In chapter ten, an angel warns him of the dangers of avarice, telling the miser, "Protect yourself against the putrid and deadly words of the devil, for he is nothing but a liar... In the end everything he does is deceitful." Here we see the angel with one hand upon the miser's shoulder, lifting his other to the light of Christ, imploring him to make the Christian decision rather than succumb to temptation and sin. The crucifix in the window seen in the miser's room is also a key feature of the Ars moriendi illustrations in these chapters, and reminds us how separate and disparate Christ is from all of the worldly troubles and possessions depicted in the room below. Even with the angel's intervention at his bedside, as Death looms, the miser's gaze and hand are directed downward, unable to resist worldly temptations, reaching for the bag of gold offered by a tempting demon. Whether or not the miser, in his last moments, will embrace the salvation offered by Christ or cling to his worldly riches, is left uncertain. This is in stark contrast to the Ars moriendi, where the angel successfully persuades him to embrace Christ. It implies that, rather than otherworldly creatures battling for the soul of a person, the decision lies in their own hand and no one else's.

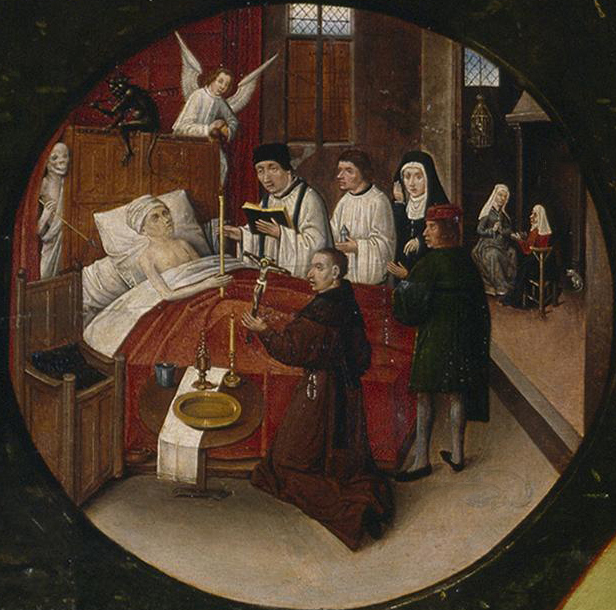
Death of the Sinner from The Seven Deadly Sins and the Four Last Things

Bosch's familiarity with the visual tradition of the Ars moriendi can also be seen in the top left roundel (pictured) depicting the death of a sinner in The Seven Deadly Sins and the Four Last Things. There are several points of similarity, such as the figure of Death and the juxtaposition of an angel and devil at the headboard. Death and the Miser could be Bosch's illustration of the sin of avarice, intended to be a part of this series, meant to depict each of the biblical deadly sins as shown through contemporary life.

Another interpretation of the gesture between the man and the demon suggests that the man is not only tempted by wealth, but is offering it to Death as a ransom. Usury was not just a display of avarice as a sin that simply required the offender to confess and seek God for forgiveness internally, but demanded a specific type of repentance. According to the Church, reparations for damages or reimbursement of monetary loss must be paid for this crime, but this is not something a miser on his deathbed would be able to do. He could, however, rectify this at the moment of death by providing this indemnity in his will, though this particular man shows no intention of doing so.

The conflict depicted here casts doubt on who exactly the man is supposed to portray. A lombard would not worry about his afterlife or any façade of piety, as they were excommunicated from the Church, publicly shamed, and denied sacrament and Christian burial. That this man is worried with at least an illusion of piety suggests that he may be a surreptitious pawnbroker rather than an obvious lombard. This concept is strengthened by the setting; an official lombard in Augsburg or Bruges, both hubs of Northern Renaissance merchants and artists, would have a normal place of business, akin to a small warehouse with a public facing office and storerooms to house and organize goods. The man in Death and the Miser does not have that, shown instead with pawned items scattered in his room and locked in a trunk, which indicate that he may want to keep these items and his activities a secret.

=== The foreground ===
The meaning of the foreground is still unclear and debated by art historians, though they're reasonably certain about the symbolism inside the room. The Ars moriendi does not contain a depiction of armor, or even pieces of it, and no other influence has satisfactorily explained their presence. Most hypotheses fall into two schools of thought; the fabric, weapons, and armor are of symbolic significance, or they represent the miser's former life, before Death came to take him. Art historians' opinions run the gamut of possibilities just in the 20th century alone, which include the following by no less than a dozen art historians:

- The objects represent an evil or malevolent force, the vanity of earthly goods, and the folly of earthly desires. They are placed there to be traps by the devil, to tempt you away from the Christian path, but their disregard in the scene shows that these earthly goods cannot help you against death. The depiction of such inorganic objects to symbolize earthly vanity, transience or decay would become a genre in itself among Flemish artists.
- They symbolize power, potentially even anger, and how the miser came to be wealthy.
- The miser died as a knight; the weapons and armor are representative of his station.
- The man might have been a knight, but he was also a dishonest steward and death has come for him.
- Gold is more useful than a knight's courage and bravery, implied by placing the gold as a central subject and part of the miser's final struggle while his knightly attire has been discarded in the foreground and outside the main events of the scene.
- The whole painting is satire about nobility and chivalry , the items symbolic of the aristocracy and their avarice.
- The red fabric could be evil, but combined with the armor has also been interpreted as a symbol for St. Martin of Tours, who famously used his military sword to cut his cloak in half to give to a beggar who lacked sufficient clothing for the winter. The architecture serves as a line between Christian generosity, symbolized by St. Martin's items in the foreground, and greed, illustrated within the room.
- The objects represent items that would have been pawned by knights, i.e. jousting equipment, or textile goods from the poor, as an allusion to usury.

No single theory has been accepted as the most correct, with art historians themselves admitting that none of the proposed explanations are entirely appropriate or suitably thorough. Schlüter and Vinken propose an alternate source to their predecessors in the form of biblical texts themselves, namely Letter to the Ephesians 6:10-17, where St. Paul makes several mentions of the armor of God: "Put on the whole armor of God, that ye may be able to stand against the while of the devil" (Ephesians 6:11); "Whereupon take unto you the whole armor of God, that ye may be able to withstand in the evil day, and having done all, to stand" (Ephesians 6:13); "Stand therefore having your loins girt about with truth, and having on the breastplate of righteousness; And your feet shod with the preparation of the gospel of peace" (Ephesians 6:14-15).

Throughout the following verses, St. Paul mentions specific pieces of armor, assigning certain aspects of Christianity to them; the helmet of salvation, the shield of faith, the hauberk of justice, and the sword of spirit, which represents the word of God itself. There are also other references to armor with assigned moral attributes in non-religious texts of the time period, such as the pieces of Lancelot's armor representing a knight's duty to the Church, and chivalry.

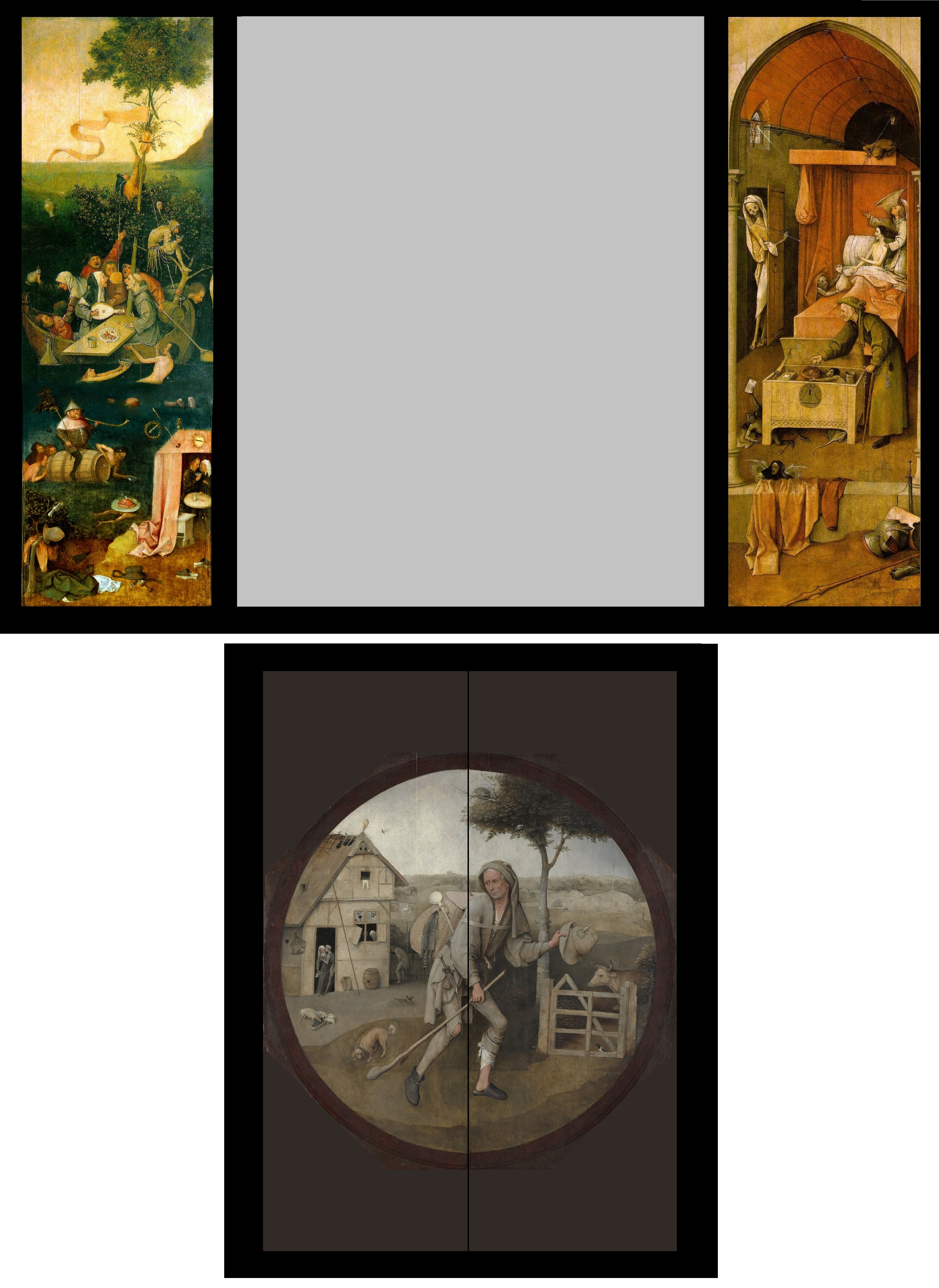
A reconstruction of the left and right wings of the triptych: at upper left The Ship of Fools; at lower left: Allegory of Gluttony and Lust. Panel at right is Death and the Miser. At bottom The Wayfarer which would have been on the outside of the triptych.

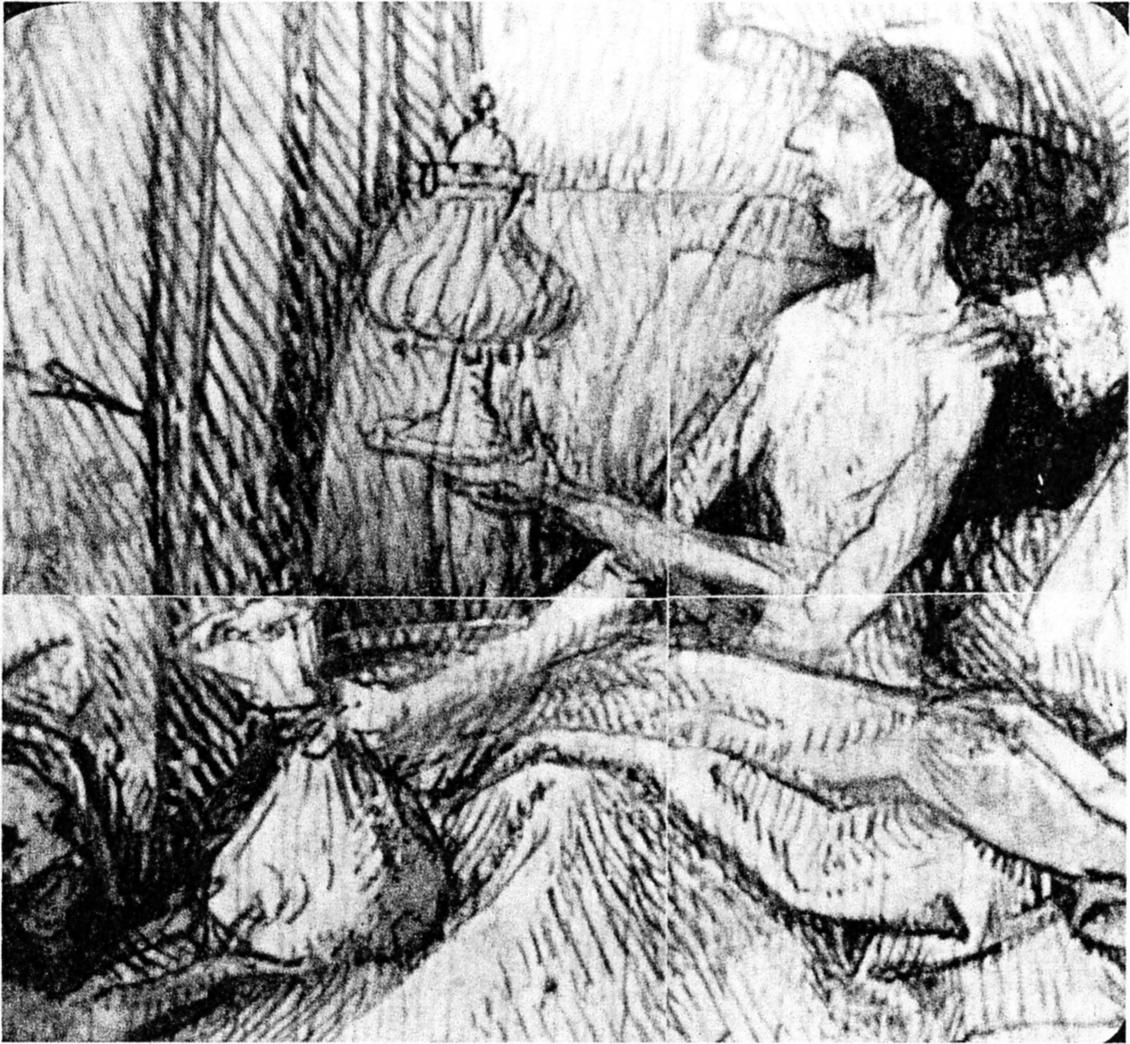
infrared reflectogram showing the miser with money bag and goblet

== Physical analysis ==
The painting is believed to be the inside of the right panel of a triptych, which has since been divided and no longer exists as a whole. The other surviving portions of the triptych are The Ship of Fools and Allegory of Gluttony and Lust, with The Wayfarer painted on the external right panel. It is one of the five fragmented triptychs by Bosch that have survived.

Several changes were made to the final painting as revealed by modern infrared analyses. A very faint remnant can be seen on a high resolution photo, but the items are not clear. Originally, a flask, rosary, and tumblers were intended to be part of the collection of items in the foreground, but they were never painted. The scan also revealed that the miser's left hand held a goblet while the right, as it appears today, is gesturing toward the money bag. This has been interpreted as an offering to Death. The meaning of the change is unclear, but it has been hypothesized that it could mean an offer of ransom; take my money, don't take me, or an appeal to Death to allow the miser to take his riches with him when he dies.

== See also ==
- List of paintings by Hieronymus Bosch
- Object information page at the National Gallery of Art (Overview, Provenance, Exhibition History, Technical Summary, and Bibliography)

== Sources ==
- Baldass, Ludwig von Hieronymus Bosch. Vienna, 1943.
- Brand-Philip, Lotte. Bosch. New York, 1956.
- Bryant, Clifton D.; Peck, Dennis L. Encyclopedia of Death and the Human Experience. Los Angeles: SAGE, 2009. ISBN 9781412951784.
- Chailley, J. "Jerome Bosch et ses symboles. Essai de decryptage." Académie Royale de Belgique, Mémoires de la Classe des Beaux-Arts 15, I: 106-108
- Cutler, D. "Bosch and the Narrenschiff: A problem in relationships." Art Bulletin. 51: 272-276.
- Fiero, Gloria K. "The humanistic Tradition Fifth Edition". 130.
- Hand, John Oliver; Wolff, Martha. Early Netherlandish Painting. National Gallery of Art, Washington. Oxford University Press, 1987. ISBN 0-521-34016-0
- Jacobs, Lynn F. (Winter 2000). "The Triptychs of Hieronymus Bosch". The Sixteenth Century Journal. 31, No. 4: 1009-1041.
- Linfert, Carl. Hieronymus Bosch. New York: H.N. Abrams, 1989. ISBN 9780810907195.
- Marijnissen, R. H. Hieronymus Bosch, The complete works. Antwerp, 1987.
- Morganstern, Anne M. (1982). "The Pawns in Bosch's Death and the Miser". Studies in the History of Art. 12: 33–41.
- Reuterswärd. Hieronymus Bosch. Stockholm, 1970.
- Schlüter, Lucy; Vinken, Pierre (2000). "The foreground of Bosch's 'Death and the Miser'". Oud Holland. 114, No. 2/4: 69–78.
- Silver, Larry (December 2001). "God in the Details: Bosch and the Judgment(s)". Art Bulletin. LXXXIII Number 4: 626–650.
- de Tervarent, G. Attributs et symboles dans l'art profane 1450-1600. Geneva, 1958, I: 34.
- de Tolnay, Charles. Hieronymus Bosch. New York: Reynal, 1966. ISBN 9780517255254.
- Walker, J. National Gallery of Art. New York, 1995.
- Wecker, Menachem (April 22 - May 5, 2016). "Largest-ever retrospective underscores Hieronymus Bosch's Catholic faith". National Catholic Reporter.
