= The Histrionic Wayfarer (after Bosch) =

2012 painting by Tim Storrier

- Artist: Tim Storrier
- Year: 2012
- Type: acrylic on canvas
- Dimensions: 183 cm × 122 cm (72 in × 48 in)

The Histrionic Wayfarer (after Bosch) is a 2012 painting by the Australian Tim Storrier. Inspired by the painting The Wayfarer by Hieronymus Bosch, it portrays a walking man with no face who carries various objects and a dog. According to Storrier, it is a self-portrait. It received the 2012 Archibald Prize.

== Description ==
The painting shows a man with no visible head who walks in a barren landscape. He wears explorer's clothes consisting of boots, a light suit and a pith helmet. He wears glasses and carries various objects in bags, pockets and an over-stuffed backback. Although the figure has no face, Storrier says it is a self-portrait, revealed by the clothes and equipment. The figure carries Storrier's dog Smudge and there is a paper with a drawing of Storrier's face that blows in the wind. Storrier describes it as a depiction of the artist's burdensome journey, showing himself "clothed in the tools to sustain the intrigue of a metaphysical survey".

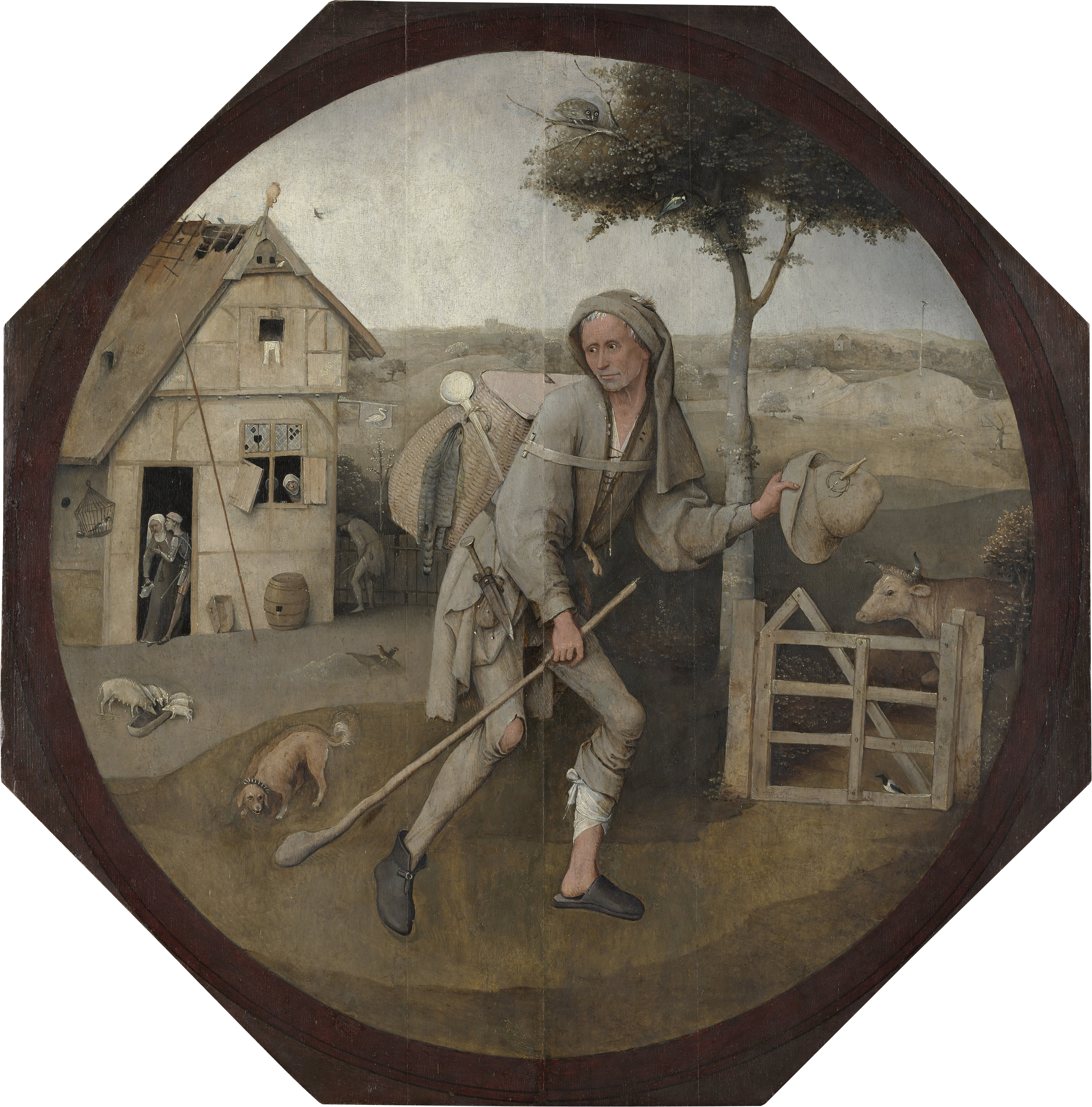
The Wayfarer, c. 1510

Storrier says the origin of the painting was a desire use Hieronymus Bosch's The Wayfarer from circa 1510 as a reference. His starting point was its subject of a pilgrim making a choice between good and evil. It then evolved into a self-portrait.

== Reception ==
The Histrionic Wayfarer (after Bosch) received the 2012 Archibald Prize for portraiture. It was the second year in a row that Storrier competed for the prize with a faceless self-portrait. He thanked his dog in his acceptance speech, saying: "I suppose you can say I have won with a portrait of a dog".

== Legacy ==
Storrier made a life-size bronze sculpture based on the painting which stands at the campus of Bond University.

Versions of the wayfarer character appear in several later Storrier paintings, such as Speed Dauber and The Dauber (rushing).

== See also ==
- List of Archibald Prize 2012 finalists
