= The Pilgrimage of the Soul =

The Pilgrimage of the Soul or The Pylgremage of the Sowle was a late medieval work in English, combining prose and lyric verse, translated from Guillaume de Deguileville's Old French Le Pèlerinage de l'Âme. It circulated in manuscript in fifteenth-century England, and was among the works printed by William Caxton. One manuscript forms part of the Egerton Collection in the British Library.

== The English translator ==
Nothing in the English work gives any indication of who the translator may have been, except for one rather cryptic indication in the verba translatoris (translator's note) at the end of two manuscript copies (Egerton and Spencer, below):

And I the symple and vnsuffisaunt translatoure of this lytel book pr[ay] and beseke as lowely as I kan to the reder or herer of this processe to for geue it me þat I haue not translated worde for word as in was in the Frensche, somewhat be cause of ille writyng of myn exampler, somewhat be cause of hard Frensch -- specially sith I am but litel expert in þat langage -- somewhat also be cause of somme thinges þat were diffuse and in som place ouerderk. Wherfore, I haue in dyuers places added and with drawe litel as what me semed needful, no thing chaunging the progresse ne substaunce of the mater, but as it myght be most lusti to the reder or herer of the matier. Also I must excuse me to the reders or herer of the matier in som place, thei it be ouer fantastyk, nought grounded nor foundable in holy scripture, ne in douctoures wordes, for I myght not go from myn auctor. Also in myn addicions, specially inpletyng of mercy and in the sermon of Doctrine of nature of the soule, and her at the ende in the matier of the Trinite, if I haue said owt othir than autentik, I beseche you all to amen de it, which þat haue kunnyng in þat matier more than haue I, for myn is symple and of litel value. This is the mark at the begynnyng of m yn addicion, 'A K', and this at the ende. 'i z'.6.

But whom these letters may refer to, is unknown. In addition to the lack of internal evidence in the Soul, there is no external evidence from any source to indicate the identity if the translator. Nevertheless, two English poets have been put forward as possible translators of the French work, but neither of them convincingly. These are John Lydgate (c.1370-1449) and Thomas Hoccleve (c.1368-1426), both of whom can be considered disciples of Chaucer.

In the Verba Translatoris at the end of the Spencer manuscript, the translator addresses the "ful worshipeful and gracious ladishipe" who "commaunded [him] to take this occupacioun". If the translator was Hoccleve, this literary patron could well have been Joan Fitzalan.

== Manuscripts of The Pilgrimage of the Soul ==
The Middle English Pilgrimage of the Soul exists complete or in part in at least ten fifteenth-century manuscripts and one printed edition.

London, The British Library, Egerton MS 615. Fols. 1r-106r contain The Pilgrimage of the Soul, including a table of contents on 1r-3v and the translator's epilogue on 106r. The hand of Egerton MS 615 and the style of its border decorations suggest a date somewhat later than Spencer 19. Probably from the same workshop. The language, according to the Linguistic Atlas of Late Mediaeval English (LALME) shows characteristics associated with the border area between Norfolk and Ely, and occasional forms associated with Rutland. Produced at the end of the second quarter of the fifteenth century.5

London, British Library, Add MS 34193. Fols. 4r-97v contain The Pilgrimage of the Soul, without the translator's epilogue or a scribal colophon. BL Add. 34193 is an anthology of English and Latin texts with historical, moral, satirical, and devotional topics. It also contains several charters, the Rule of Celestine, and a treatise on the Westminster Synod of 1125, which suggests that the compilation was made by an ecclesiastical community. The language, according to LALME, shows characteristics of East Leicestershire.

Oxford, Corpus Christi College, MS 237. Omits words of the translator. This copy of Soul is the youngest and least elaborate of all. The manuscript is an anthology of texts that are mostly of a religious nature. Amongst other texts, it contains two Saints’ Lives and Lydgate's Dance Macabre. Its language shows a mixture of dialectal forms, which may be the result of repeated copying. The scribe of Soul gives his initials as ‘EC’ on fol 137r, and is probably the Edmund Carpenter whose ownership of the manuscript is indicated in a fifteenth- century hand as the first inscription on the front pastedown: ‘iste liber constat Edmondus Carpenter.’

Oxford, Bodleian Library, MS Bodley 770 (2552). Folios 1r-99v contain a copy of Soul without the translator's epilogue or scribal colophon. This manuscript's inconsistencies and idiosyncratic features indicate that it is a provincial product of the middle of the fifteenth century. According to LALME, the language of the manuscript shows the characteristics of the border area of Norfolk and Ely. Sir James Ley (1550–1629), the first Earl of Marlborough, donated this manuscript to the Bodleian Library in 1612.

Oxford, University College, MS 181. This manuscript consists of 155 leaves. Fols. 1r-153v contain a copy of Soul without the translator's epilogue or a scribal colophon. The language shows characteristics associated by LALME with Northamptonshire. The craftsmanship of the manuscript indicates that it is the work of professional artists working in the middle of the fifteenth century. A partially erased inscription shows that the book was given to Henry Percy, prior of the Augustinian priory of St. Paul in Newham, Bedfordshire by his predecessor John Renhall in 1491.

Cambridge, Gonville and Caius College, MS 124/61. This manuscript consists of 130 vellum leaves. Omits 2 quires at the beginning, the words of the translator, and a scribal colophon. This is one of the earliest known copies of Soul. LALME associates the characteristics of its language with Norfolk, with some features of Ely and Lincolnshire. The manuscript shows a fairly high degree of standardisation and is the work of two professional scribes. It may therefore have been produced at a metropolitan bookshop or by a network of artists.

Cambridge University Library, MS Kk.1.7. This manuscript originally consisted of 136 leaves, of which 124 are left. fols. 1v- 124v contain Soul, without the translator's epilogue or scribal colophon. Its language contains forms associated by LALME with the border between Norfolk and Suffolk, with the occasional use of forms associated with the area between Leicestershire and Lincolnshire. The manuscript contains additions with a doctrinal content that suggests that Kk 1.7 or its exemplar is of clerical or monastic origin. One fifteenth- century or sixteenth-century owner so strongly identified with the protagonist of the story that he wrote "his iaset Tomas Showall" on the bed in the miniature on fol. 1r, "his iaset y" in the right margin of the page, and "hic iaseth Tome" in the right margin of fol. 92r.

Hatfield (Hertfordshire), Hatfield House, MS. Cecil 270. This manuscript consists of 75 leaves. Fols.1r-72v contain Soul without the translator's epilogue. Its language shows characteristics associated by LALME with Cambridgeshire. It contains numerous fifteenth and sixteenth-century inscriptions indicating that it was made for a member of the royal court and continued to circulate among families associated with the court until the early seventeenth century. Henry VI is the earliest known owner of Cecil 270, though nothing in the decoration or original contents of the book indicates that it was made for him. ‘Rex Henricus Sextus’ appears on ff 1r, 36v, and 72v, in the same fifteenth- century hand. On paleographical, artistic, and textual grounds, Cecil 270 seems to be the work of professional artists in the 1440s.

New York Public Library, Spencer 19 (formerly Petworth 2). Spencer 19 consists of 136 leaves. The Pilgrimage of the Soul can be found on fols. 1r-133v. It includes a table of contents and a translator's epilogue but lacks a scribal colophon. It is the work of two scribes who worked in the second quarter of the fifteenth century. Its language shows features associated by LALME with the border area between Norfolk and Lincolnshire. The second scribe also uses forms typical of Rutland or Nottinghamshire and even Kent. On flyleaf Av, a fifteenth-century hand has written "Liber domini Thome Comorworth militis". Sir Thomas Cumberworth was Sheriff and Member of Parliament for Lincolnshire and died in 1451. He mentions the book, which he calls "my boke of grasdew of the sow[l]e" and bequeaths to the priest at chantry of the Virgin Mary at Somerby parish church, in his 1437 will.

Melbourne, State Library of Victoria, MS *096/G94. This manuscript contains 217 leaves. Fols. 1r-95v contain a copy of the prose Life of the Manhood. Fols. 96r-215v contain a copy of The Pilgrimage of the Soul. The incipit on fol. 1r gives the title of the whole book as Grace Dieu. The handwriting dates from the second quarter of the fifteenth century and is the work of two, possibly even four, scribes. Most of the work is done Scribe A, who identifies himself as ‘Benet’. LALME identifies the language of scribe A as Lincolnshire. This is the only manuscript known to contain both The Pilgrimage of the Soul and The Pilgrimage of the Life of the Manhood. The first known owner of this manuscript was Sir John Roucliffe of Cowthorpe, South Yorkshire, who died in 1531, whose name appears in the bottom margin of fols. 1r and 215v.

Parts of The Pilgrimage of the Soul appear in the following manuscripts:

London, British Library, Add MS 37049. Leaves 69b-77 contain "The Apple of Solace", a short prose tract containing eight poems and four prose parts from the Soul. This manuscript's content and language suggest that it was compiled by the Carthusians in the Northeast Midlands during the middle of the fifteenth century.

London, British Library, Harley MS 7333. Harley MS 7333 consists of 211 leaves and is an anthology of poetry and prose, primarily in English, including works by Benedict Burgh, Lydgate, Chaucer, Gower and Hoccleve. Fol. 148v contains book 1, chapter 2 of Soul. The scant linguistic information we can derive from this page shows forms associated by LALME with Leicestershire and Rutland.

San Marino, Huntington Library HM 111 (formerly Phillipps 8151). HM 111 consists of forty-seven leaves. It is a collection of sixteen poems by Thomas Hoccleve. Fols. 3r-7v contain Hoccleve's ‘Compleynte of the Virgin’, without the first six stanzas, which appears as ‘The Lament of the Green Tree’ in book 4 of The Pilgrimage of the Soul.

== Adaptation in the translation ==
The English translation of the French Âme is not an extremely faithful one. As McGerr's edition shows, though the translator has remained faithful to much of the original—the narrative structure and allegorical techniques remain the backbone of the English text—he made some changes that make Soul more suited for a fifteenth-century English audience. The main change is that of the narrator of the story. In Guillaume's work the protagonist is clearly a Cistercian monk who can easily be identified with Guillaume himself. In the English Soul, the narrator has become an Everyman with whom the reader can identify. The differences can be seen from the beginning of the work on. Guillaume's Âme is clearly meant as a sequel to his Vie. The English translation is not. The reader can understand the purpose of the work without having read Life of the Manhood first. All the references that Guillaume makes in Âme to his previous work become references of the pilgrim's earthly life in Soul. The pilgrim in Âme, when he needs an advocate to speak for him in the heavenly court, appeals to monastic patrons such as St. Benedict and St. Bernard. Since these saints lose much of their relevance to the English Everyman pilgrim, they are omitted. In the thirtieth chapter of the first book, Guillaume's discussion of the monastic ideal is replaced with Mercy questioning Justice on God's purpose in creating mankind and ordaining laws and about the relationship between earthly law and divine law. She builds a case for the pilgrim's salvation on the basis of the answers Justice gives her.

Another typically English feature introduced into the English Soul is the occasional use of alliteration for dramatic effect. As McGerr notes, we find a fine example in chapter thirteen of book one, where the pilgrim is accused of several sins:

He hath iourneyed by the perylous pas of Pryde, by the malycious montayne of Wrethe and Enuye, he hath waltred hym self and wesshen in the lothely lake of cursyd Lechery, he hath ben encombred in the golf of Glotony. Also he hath mysgouerned hym in the contre of Couetyse, and often tyme taken his rest whan tyme was best to trauayle, slepyng and slomeryng in the bed of Slouthe.

McGerr uses the term "Englishing", a term also used by fifteenth-century English writers, rather than ‘translating’. The translator loosed his knowledge of theology and English tradition on Âme to change Guillaume's courtly poem into a polemical work that implicitly answered the attacks of Lollards and other critics of Roman Catholic doctrine. I think therein lies much of the value the work had for a fifteenth-century English audience, especially a lay one.

== English printings ==
=== William Caxton's The Pylgremage of the Sowle ===
The William Caxton printing indicates that the French Âme was translated into English in 1413. Clubb, in the introduction to his edition of MS Egerton 615, mentions that two of the manuscripts (BL Add. 34193 and Corpus Christi MS 237) give no date for the translation; two (Bodleian Library MS 770 and University College MS 181) give 1400 as the date. Three manuscripts (Egerton 615, Spencer 19, and Gonville and Caius College, MS 124/61) and Caxton's print give 1413 as the date. Even more specifically, the Caxton print and University College MS 181 state that it ‘endeth in the vigyle of Seynt Bartholomew’, that is, August 24. The weight of the evidence, therefore, points to 1413, and 1400 is probably a scribal error. But the Caxton print does not state by whom the translation was made. Neither do any of the manuscripts.

=== Later editions of The Pylgremage of the Sowle ===
The only editions of Sowle (or parts of it) since Caxton are as follows: Katherine Custs's 1859 reprint of selected portions of Caxton's work, Furnivall's 1892 transcript of the "Lamentacion of the Grene Tree" from MS Phillipps 8151 (now Huntington Library MS HM 111), Furnivall's 1897 transcript of the fourteen poems from British Library MS Egerton 615, mother Barry's 1931 editions of Spencer 1910, Clubb's 1954 edition of British Library Egerton MS 615, and Rosemarie Potz McGerr's hitherto partly published critical edition of Spencer 19, in two volumes, the first of which, containing the introduction, the first two books and their notes, was published in 1990.
