= Le Pèlerinage de l'Âme =

Le Pèlerinage de l'Âme (English: The Pilgrimage of the Soul) is a fourteenth-century poem written in Old French by Guillaume de Deguileville. A modern edition was published by the Roxburghe Club as Le Pèlerinage de l’Ame de Guillaume de Deguileville, edited by J. J. Stürzinger (London: Nichols and Sons, 1895).

A fifteenth-century English translation, The Pilgrimage of the Soul, circulated in manuscript in late-medieval England and was among the works printed by William Caxton.

== See also ==
- Holy Allegory (Bellini)
