= Guillaume de Deguileville =

French writer (1295–1360)

Self-portrait of Guillaume de Digulleville, Le pèlerinage de la vie humaine

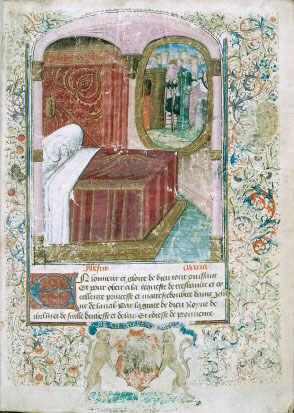
Guillaume de Deguileville dreaming of celestial Jerusalem (France, 15th century).

Guillaume de Deguileville (1295 - before 1358) was a French Cistercian and writer. His authorship is shown by one acrostic in Le Pèlerinage de la Vie Humaine, two in Le Pèlerinage de l'Âme, and one in Le Pèlerinage de Jhesucrist. These acrostics take the form of a series of stanzas, each beginning with a letter of Deguileville's name. According to indications in the Vie his father was called Thomas, he was named after his godfather, and his patron saint was William of Chaalis. There is no evidence that his name is connected with a village of Guileville.

== Life and writings ==
Guillaume entered the Cistercian abbey of Chaalis in 1316, at the age of twenty-one. This is in agreement with his assertion in the second redaction of the Vie, where he states that he has been in the abbey for thirty-nine years. The abbey of Chaalis—or what is left of it, for it is no more than a ruin nowadays—is in the diocese of Senlis, north of Paris, and was founded in the twelfth century. A manuscript of a French prose rendering of the Âme states that Guillaume eventually became prior of Chaalis, but it is not known whether this is true or, if so, when this happened.

According to the second redaction of the Vie, Guillaume was thirty-six years old when he wrote his first redaction in 1330, so he must have been born ca. 1294. The Âme was written immediately after the second redaction of the Vie (1355), and in it he states that he was over 60 years old when writing the Âme. He also refers to a passage in the Vie which only occurs in the second redaction of the poem, which is another indication that he wrote the Âme after 1355. Guillaume wrote this second redaction of the Vie, he states in its prologue, because the first redaction had been stolen. This does not mean that this first redaction was lost to posterity, for, according to Clubb in the introduction of his edition of Egerton 615, J. J. Stürzinger based his edition of Vie on it.

We can date Deguileville's poems as follows: The first version of the Vie was written between 1330 and 1332; the second version of it around 1355; the Âme between 1355 and 1358; and Jhesucrist about 1358. Some seventy-three manuscripts of Guillaume's works, including forty-six of the Âme, are extant in various libraries in Europe. The only edition of Guillaume's three poems is that of Stürzinger, who based his edition of the Vie on the first redaction. The second redaction has never been edited.

Although the surviving manuscripts of the Pèlerinage trilogy render the author's name as "Guillaume de Deguileville", a number of other variants can be found in both medieval and modern sources. One alternative spelling is Guillaume de Deguilleville. Modernized form Guillaume de Digulleville is also used. A different interpretation of the surname gives Guillaume de Guileville or Guillaume de Guilleville. The Latin version of the name is Guillermus de Deguilevilla.

=== Pèlerinage de la Vie Humaine: summary ===
The Vie is summarised thus by Marco Nievergelt:

The Vie is built around the two central metaphors of the journey and the spiritual battle, peregrinatio and psychomachia. The allegory begins with the pilgrim's vision of the New Jerusalem, framed by a mirror seen within a dream. Expressing his wish to travel towards the Holy City, the dreamer is first taken by Grace Dieu across a stream into the Church, prefiguration of the Holy City, and there has to undergo a thorough instruction in Christian doctrine and the sacraments. Thereafter the pilgrim is equipped with a Pauline armour, a scrip, and staff, and finally sets out on his journey. He meets a variety of personified abstractions that either aid or hinder his progress — Rude Understanding, Nature, Reason — until he reaches a parting of the ways and has to choose between the paths of Idleness and Labour, respectively personified as an attractive young lady and a ragged, seemingly foolish old man. Choosing the easy option he is soon attacked by a series of repulsive old women who personify the seven deadly sins, and despite his lamentations and regrets fails to return to the straight and narrow path. After some further troubles and instructive encounters, and a prematurely interrupted bath under the Rock of Penitence, the pilgrim reaches the Sea of the World, where Satan fishes and hunts to capture human souls. He fruitlessly tries to cross it, until rescue arrives in the form of the Ship of Religion, offering the pilgrim a short-cut to the New Jerusalem in the form of monastic life. He boards the ship and enters one of its 'castles', a Cistercian monastery. The poem ends with the pilgrim's death in the monastery, coinciding with the awakening of the dreamer, who then decides to commit his dream to writing.

== English translations ==
It was not until the 15th century that the first two parts of the Pèlerinage trilogy, Pèlerinage de la Vie Humaine and Pèlerinage de l'Âme, appeared in English. The Pilgrimage of the Soul, anonymous but sometimes attributed to John Lydgate or Thomas Hoccleve, is known at least 10 complete and 3 partial manuscripts. The date for the translation is omitted in some manuscripts, and given as either 1400 or 1413 in others, one specifically saying it "endeth in the vigyle of Seynt Bartholomew", that is, August 24. This last quote, with 1413 dating, is also repeated in the first printed edition published by William Caxton in 1483.

However, a considerably older English version of one passage is known. Geoffrey Chaucer's poem ABC is in fact a translation of a prayer to Virgin Mary from Pèlerinage de la Vie Humaine. The form of the translation, closely modelled on that of the French original, is a particular type of an alphabetical poem. Both acrostics are composed of 23 stanzas, 12-lines-long in Guillaume's case and 8-lines-long in Chaucer's, each stanza beginning with letters from A to Z in order (J, U, and W excluded). While its precise date is not known, it is certainly a 14th-century work, pre-dating Chaucer's death in 1400; it may even be one of his earliest works, although this can not be proved conclusively. The main evidence comes from the Second Chaucer edition published by Thomas Speght in 1602. According to Speght, the poem was written, "some say", by the order of Blanche, duchess of Lancaster, the mother of King Henry IV. If this story is indeed a record of a genuine medieval tradition, the poem would have been written in 1368 at the latest, as Blanche died that year. This would make ABC Chaucer's earliest work, preceding The Book of the Duchess, an elegy commemorating Blanche's death.

== Influence ==
Around ninety manuscripts contain at least one of the three Pèlerinages, indicating wide circulation in the Middle Ages. It is widely accepted that as well as translating a passage from Pèlerinage de la Vie Humaine, Geoffrey Chaucer drew inspiration from all three works, not least in the conception of pilgrimage developed in his Canterbury Tales.

In 2011, Marco Nievergelt argued that Le Pèlerinage de vie humaine was a significant influence on the Middle English poem Sir Gawain and the Green Knight.

== Editions and translations ==
- Stürzinger, Jakob J. (ed.) Le pèlerinage de la vie humaine; edited by J. J. Stürzinger. London: Printed for the Roxburghe Club [by] Nichols & Sons. "The following Pelerinage de vie humaine is the first recension of the first Pilgrimage as written by the author in the years 1330 to 1332. The text is printed from MS. t, a fourteenth-century manuscript preserved in the Bibliothèque nationale at Paris, marked: Fonds franc. no. 1818, which offered the best text, and is in a spelling that differs but slightly from that of the author"—P. [v].
- The first two books of the trilogy have been translated into modern English, with introduction and commentary, by Eugene S. Clasby: The Pilgrimage of Human Life (Garland Library of Medieval Literature, 1992) and The Pilgrimage of the Soul (Arizona Center for Medieval and Renaissance Studies, 2016).

== Sources ==
- Nievergelt, Marco; Kamath, Stephanie A. Viereck Gibbs (2013). The Pèlerinage Allegories of Guillaume de Deguileville: Tradition, Authority and Influence. Cambridge: D.S.Brewer. ISBN 9781843843344.
- Kamath, Stephanie A. Viereck Gibbs (2012). Authorship and First-Person Allegory in Late Medieval France and England. Boydell & Brewer. ISBN 978-1-84384-313-9.
