= Jheronimus Bosch—Visions of Genius =

2016 art exhibition about the works of Hieronymus Bosch

Death and the Miser, on loan to the exhibition form the National Gallery of Art, DC

Jheronimus Bosch—Visions of Genius (Dutch: Jheronimus Bosch - Visioenen van een genie) was a 2016 art exhibition (13 February until 8 May 2016) at the Noordbrabants Museum in 's-Hertogenbosch, the Netherlands, about the work of Hieronymus Bosch, a native of 's-Hertogenbosch.

Seventeen of the world's known Bosch paintings were on display in the exhibition, along with 19 drawings. The Telegraph described the work of curator Charles de Mooij in gathering them as "a feat of stamina and silver-tongued curatorial cunning."

The exhibition presented Bosch as "a great realist" highlighting the realistically-painted detail in his surreal paintings, backdating the Renaissance in the process since Bosch painted half a century before Vasari published.

The years of intensive research by the Bosch Research and Conservation Project that preceded the exhibition, led scholars to demote two paintings belonging to the Prado, The Cure of Folly and The Temptation of St. Anthony. Long thought to be by Bosch, they are now regarded as having been painted by followers or by artists in Bosch's workshop.

However, as a result of the research, the small Temptation of St. Anthony belonging to the Nelson-Atkins Museum of Art in Kansas City, Missouri, long thought to have been painted by a follower, is now regarded as the work of Bosch's own hand.

A documentary film based on constructing this show was made in 2016. It is titled Hieronymus Bosch, Touched by the Devil.

== Paintings ==
The following paintings by Hieronymus Bosch were on display:

image	Painting	Date	inventory number	Collection	Cat. Nr.
	The Adoration of the Magi	1474s	13.26	Metropolitan Museum of Art	
	Christ Child with a Walking Frame	1480	GG_6429	Kunsthistorisches Museum	
	Last Judgement	1486s	0000.GRO0208.I	Groeningemuseum; Flemish Art Collection	
	St. John the Evangelist on Patmos	1489	1647A	Gemäldegalerie	
	St. John the Baptist in the Wilderness	1489	Inv. 8155	Museum of Lázaro Galdiano	
	Saint Christopher Carrying the Christ Child	1490s 1500s	St 26	Museum Boijmans Van Beuningen	
	Allegory of Gluttony and Lust	1490		Yale University Art Gallery	03
	The Wayfarer	1490; 1494	1079 (OK)	Museum Boijmans Van Beuningen	01
	Death and the Miser	1494; 1500s	1952.5.33	National Gallery of Art	04
	Ecce Homo	1495s	1577	Städel	
	Wilgefortis Triptych	1497s	TS 2° p. n. 4	Doge's Palace	
	Ship of Fools	1500s	RF 2218	Department of Paintings of the Louvre	02
	Christ Carrying the Cross	1500s	GG_6429	Kunsthistorisches Museum	
	Saint Jerome	1500	1908-H	Museum of Fine Arts, Ghent; Flemish Art Collection	
	The Conjurer	1510s		Saint-Germain-en-Laye Civic Museum	
	The Hell and the Flood	1515	St 27 recto, St 28 recto St 27 verso, St 28 verso	Museum Boijmans Van Beuningen	
	The Haywain Triptych	1515	P02052	Museo del Prado	05
	Passio Triptych	1530s	264, 265, 266	Museu de Belles Arts de València	
	The Temptation of St Anthony	1600s	P02049	Museo del Prado	

== See also ==
- List of paintings by Hieronymus Bosch
- Hieronymus Bosch drawings
