= The Temptation of St Anthony (Kansas City) =

Painting by Hieronymus Bosch

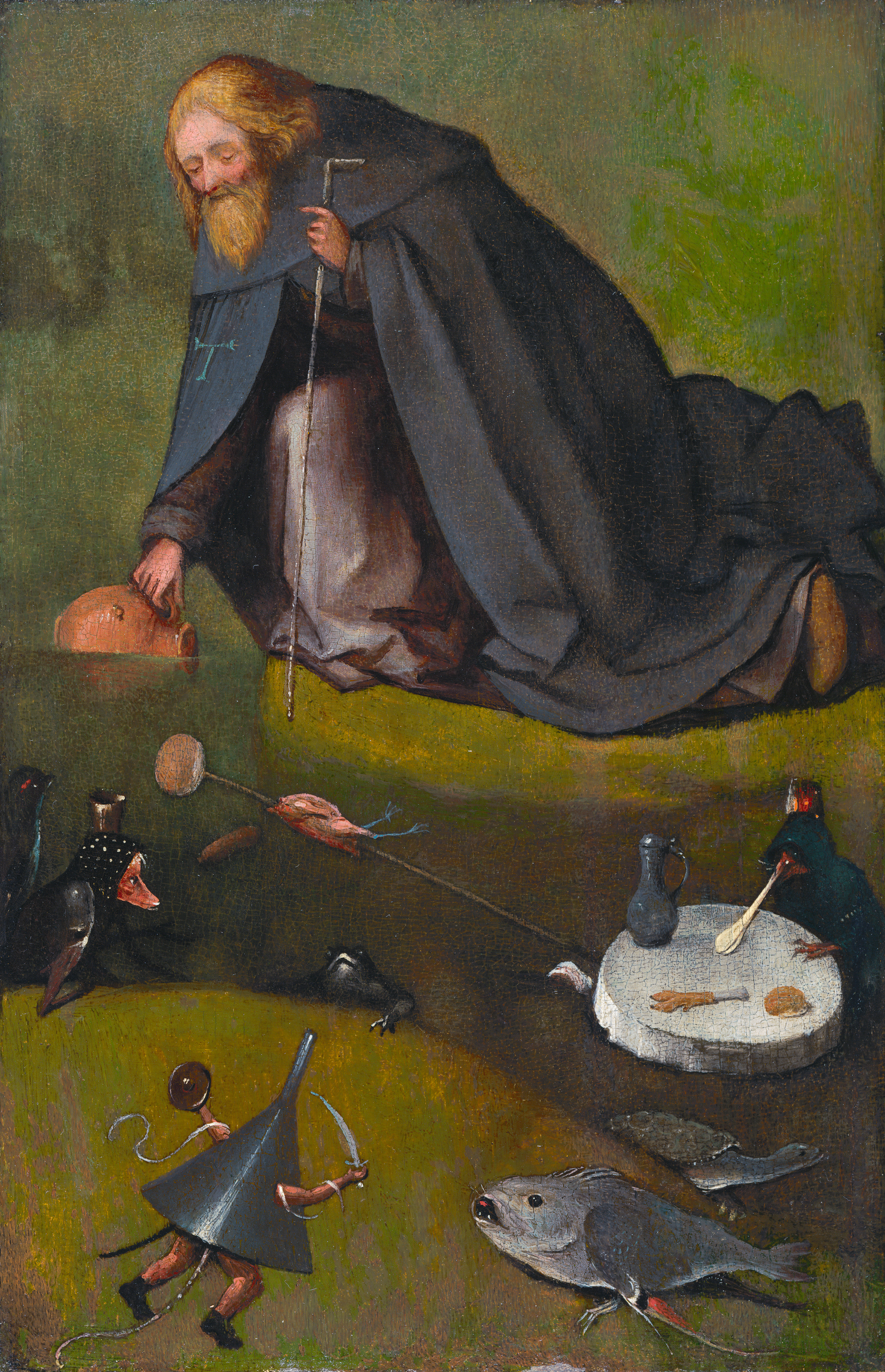
- Year: c. 1500–1510
- Medium: Oil on oak panel
- Dimensions: 38.6 cm × 29.5 cm (15.2 in × 11.6 in)
- Location: Nelson-Atkins Museum of Art; Kansas City

The Temptation of Saint Anthony is an oil-on-oak, single-panel painting by the Early Netherlandish artist Hieronymus Bosch, executed c.1500-1510. The painting features a scene from the life of Saint Anthony in which he was being tempted to sin by demonic spirits. These creatures have symbolic meanings in this work. These demonic creatures are references to other paintings by Bosch.

It is housed in the Nelson-Atkins Museum of Art in Kansas City, where it has been since 1935. In its time at the museum, it has undergone research to settle disputes over the true artist of the painting. The research concluded this piece was created by Bosch himself.

== Subject ==
Depicted in this painting is Saint Anthony filling a crock with water. St. Anthony was a popular subject among artists in the sixteenth century. Though St. Anthony's life was originally recorded by Saint Athanaius in 357 CE, it was popularized in Europe during the thirteenth century after being included in the Legenda Aurea. This collection of stories about saints was translated into different languages and circulated across Europe.

St. Anthony is revered as a hermit saint who explored the desert alone. During his wandering he was plagued by demons and inclinations toward sin. However, St. Anthony resisted the temptations.

Bosch painted many scenes of St. Anthony. The saint was his most recurring subject because of St. Anthony's connection to Bosch's own life. One reason St. Anthony was such a popular subject matter was because of outbreaks of St. Anthony's fire during Bosch's lifetime. In the fifteenth and early sixteenth century it was a popular belief among Europeans that St. Anthony had the power to either punish sinners with the disease or heal those afflicted.

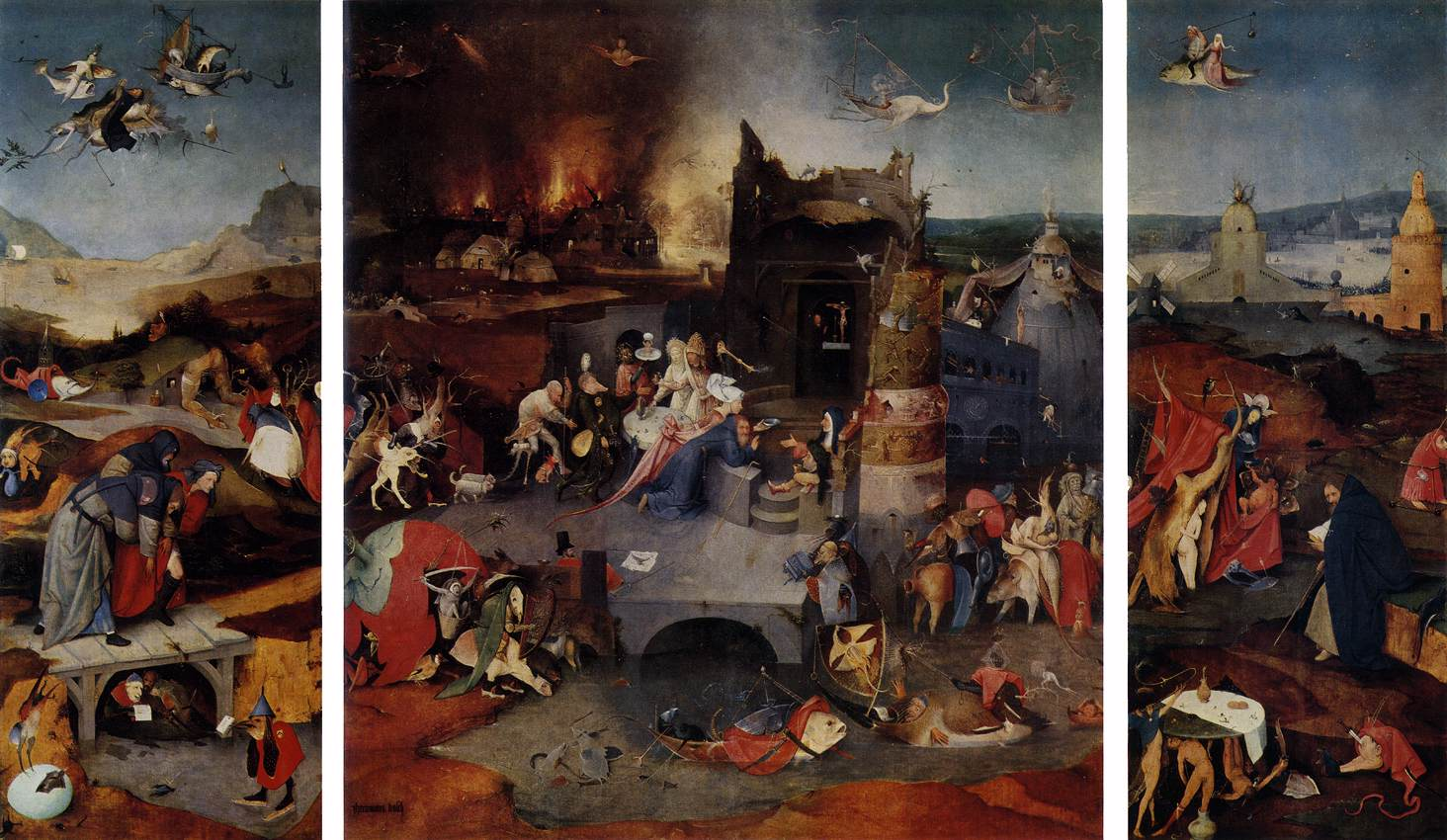
The Temptation of St. Anthony (Lisbon) depiction contrasts the serenity in the Kansas City piece, showing St. Anthony in chaotic torment.

In this portrayal, St. Anthony contrasts with the Temptation of St. Anthony (Lisbon). This piece depicts a more sorrowful St. Anthony tormented by lesser demons whereas some of Bosch's other depiction of St. Anthony show him in more disruptive torment.

== Visual details ==
Across Bosch's work he reuses grotesque and obscure creatures as a motif representing demons. In this scene, St. Anthony is surrounded by these small grotesque demons in line with Bosch's typical style. Among these demons are a hooded fox-headed demon on the left side, a spoon-billed demon at a table on the right, and a fish fighting a funnel with human limbs along the bottom. Also prevalent in this piece is the presence of food, such as the roasted bird over the water and on the set table the spoon-billed creature is seated at.

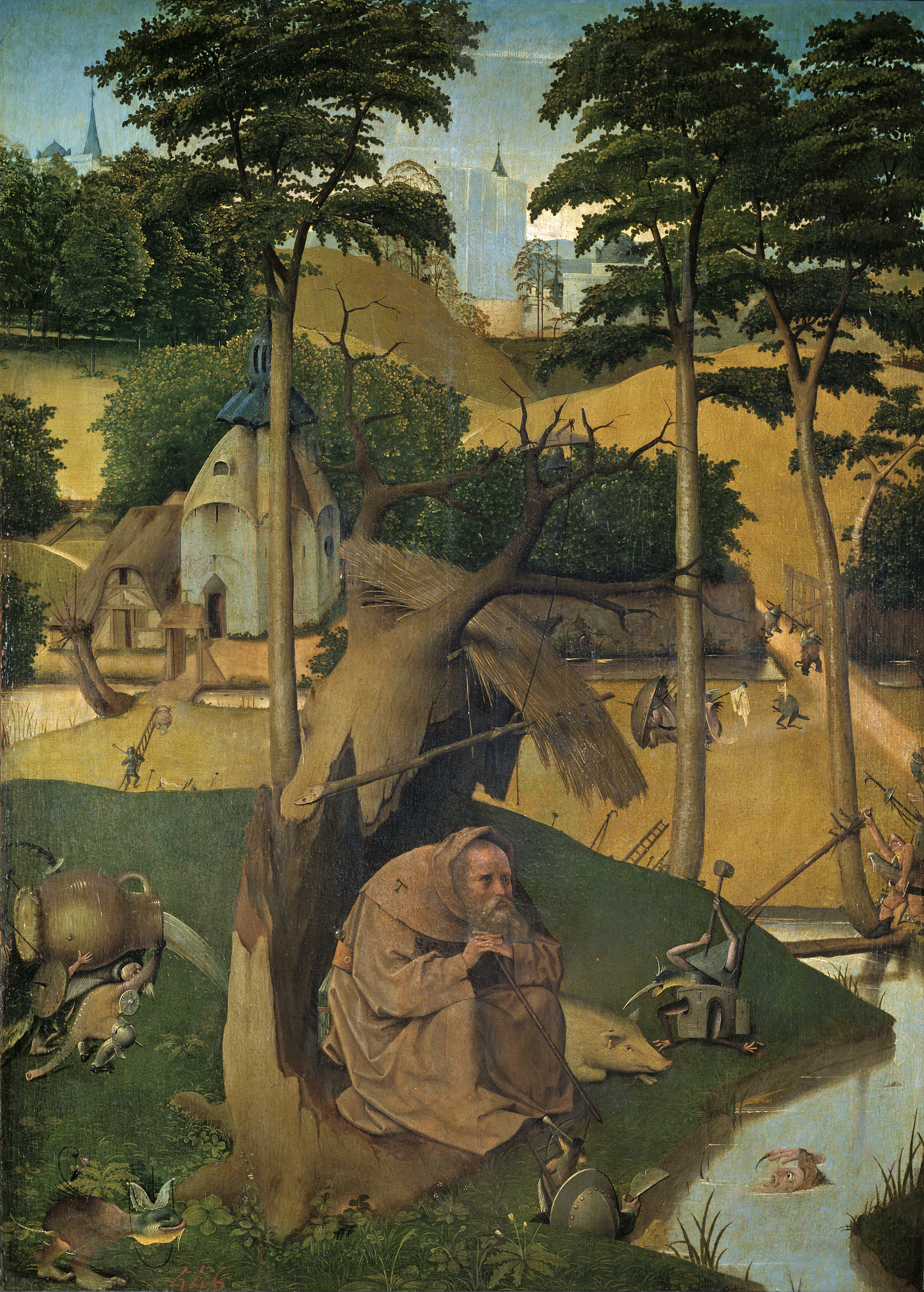
Behind St. Anthony in this image is a demon emptying the crock that is filled in the Kansas City piece

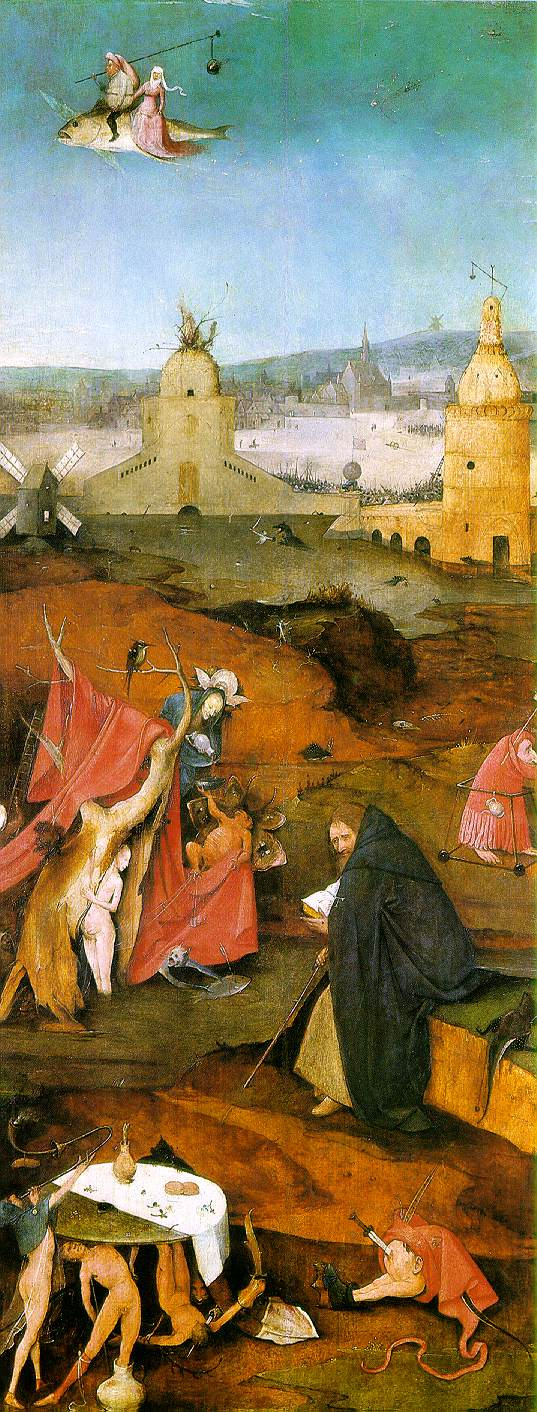
Behind St. Anthony is a demon equivalent to the fox-headed creature in the Kansas City piece.

There are several notable examples of details in this work which are also found in Bosch's other paintings. In the Kansas City Temptation of St. Anthony, St. Anthony is featured filling a crock with water. This crock is also featured in the Hermit Saints Triptych. Another motif found in the Hermit Saints Triptych which relates to the Kansas City Temptation of St. Anthony is St. Anthony's body. In both pieces St. Anthony is in the same position. In both paintings St. Anthony is hunched over with his arm out to fill his crock with water. The crock St. Anthony is filling is also in the Temptation of St. Anthony in Madrid. St. Anthony's crock of water is noticeably being emptied by one of the demons tormenting St. Anthony in the Madrid piece.

Alongside St. Anthony's positioning and crock, the creatures are the primary connection between the Kansas City piece and other works by Bosch. The fox-headed creature is one example of this. In the Kansas City Temptation of St. Anthony, the fox-headed creature is featured as one of the demons causing mischief for the saint. The fox-headed creature is also apparent on the right panel of the Lisbon Temptation of St. Anthony triptych. The similarity between these figures is seen through their shared hoods and white spots. Another example of Bosch repeating creatures is the spoon-billed creature. The spoon-billed creature is also a feature in The Garden of Earthly Delights, it is noticeable on the right panel in the Hell scene.

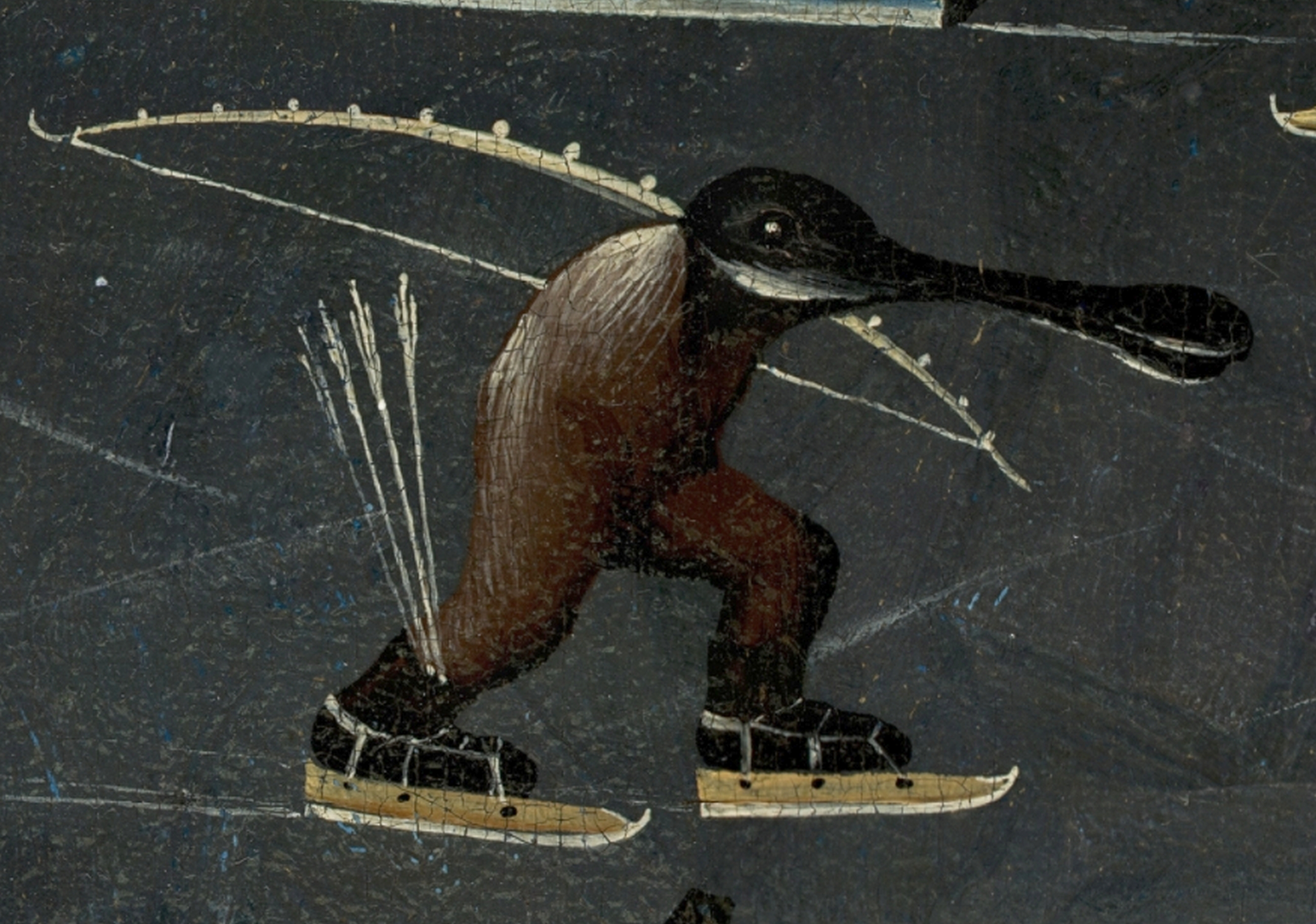
Detail of the spoon-billed creature in The Garden of Earthly Delights right panel.

== Symbolism ==
The kinds of demons and food Bosch includes in this piece demonstrate symbolic messages. In this St. Anthony painting Bosch uses symbolism to note gluttony, sexuality, and folly.

The funnel serves as symbolism for the devil and gluttony because the funnel demonstrates the overindulgence of pouring a lot in and having it immediately fall out. In this painting, the creature with the funnel for a body engaging in battle with the fish exemplifies this symbolism. In contrast, the fish the funnel is fighting symbolizes folly. This is because of its association with the Flemish April Fool's Day, which used fish. The fish was also associated with other forms of unrestrained merry making.

Some motifs have several potential meanings. The roasted bird has two potential meanings in regard to symbolism in this painting. The first is as a symbol of gluttony and the second is alluding to sexual acts. Similarly, the goat hoof which lays in front of the spoon-billed creature also has multiple meanings. This hoof is a stand in for a full goat which in Bosch's work and across Flemish Renaissance art represents both merrymakers and inappropriate sexuality. This is demonstrated in other paintings depicting the temptation of St. Anthony where she-goats are taunting St. Anthony as women ride them.

Additionally, both the fox-headed creature and the spoon-billed creature wear hoods that show their symbolism. The hoods hint at the demonic nature of these creatures by calling on a Flemish proverb. This also connects to Bosch's humorous sensibilities because the hoods worn by the demons are satirizing the hoods worn by monks.

== Attribution ==
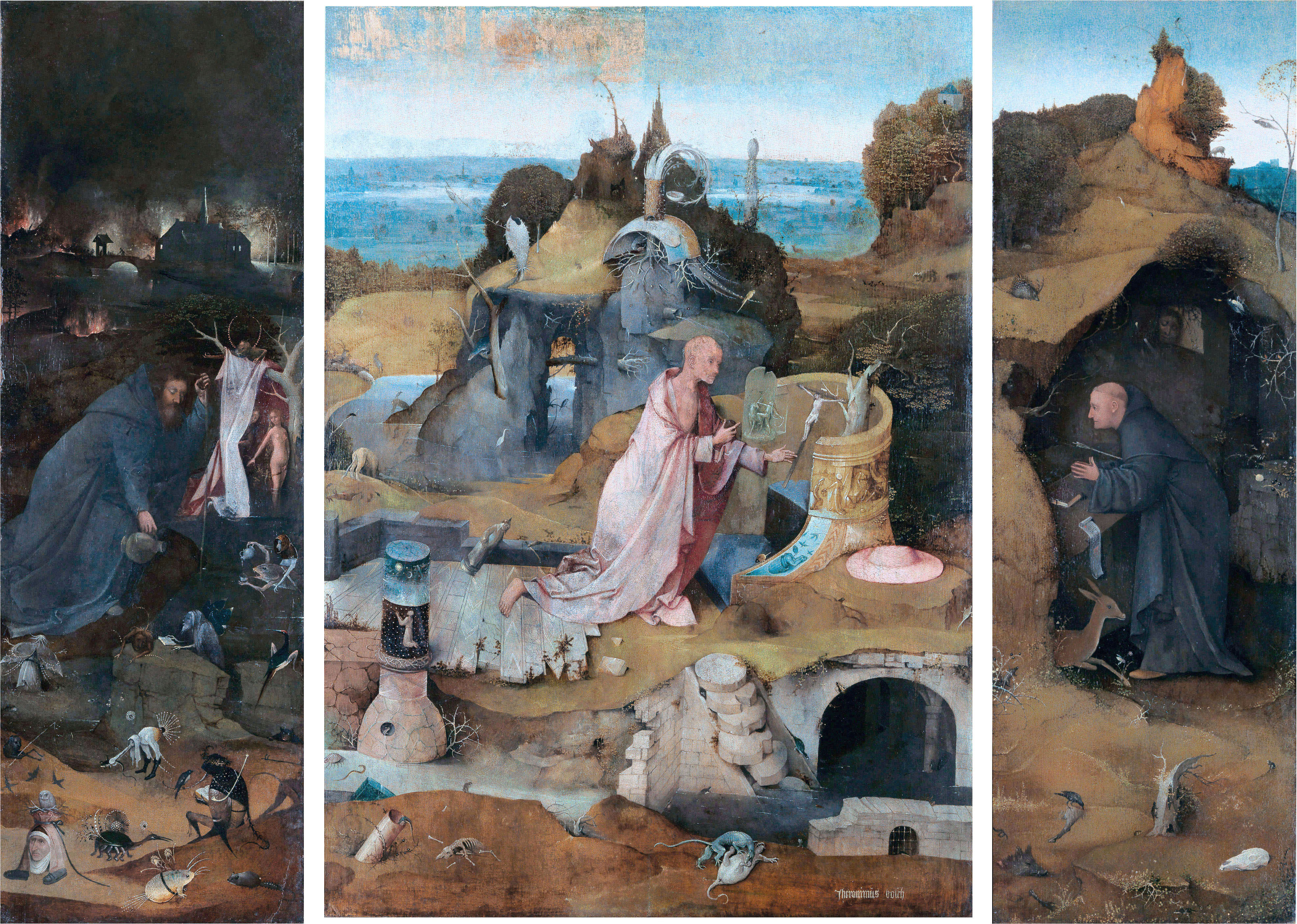
The Hermit Saints Triptych work was used as a comparison to identify the Temptation of St. Anthony piece as a work of Bosch.

There was a dispute as to whether this work was a Bosch autograph or a piece by the workshop until the Bosch Research and Conservation Project concluded it to be autograph based on evidence presented by the underdrawing and a dendrochronlogical exam. The year provided from the dendrochronological analysis supplied that the latest year the wood could be sourced from is 1482, indicating the painting was created in the early 1500s. The retouching of the piece made it so the work of the artist could only be identified after professionals analyzed the underdrawing revealed by infrared photography. It was exhibited in 2016 as part of the Jheronimus Bosch—Visions of Genius exhibition.

While trying to determine the true artist of this piece, researchers analyzed each aspect of the painting and how these aspects aligned with Bosch's style, eventually determining that the piece corresponds with works from Bosch's later life. One critical comparison was the left panel of the Hermit Saints Triptych. The research team used the similarities between these figures positions and their action of filling the crock with water as evidence the Kansas City piece was painted by Bosch.

One of the key arguments against this painting being a work of Bosch was the lack of the devil disguised as a temptress, which is seen in other versions of Bosch's Temptation of Saint Anthony. After the analysis determining the piece was a fragment of a larger piece, the Devil as temptress was determined to be a lost part of the painting. The painting was determined to be a fragment based on the shape, size, and composition of the panel. Because of this, researchers determined this piece would have belonged to a larger scene. The scene was likely similar to the other St. Anthony paintings done by Bosch by being filled with more demons.

== See also ==
- List of paintings by Hieronymus Bosch
