= Hieronymus Bosch, Touched by the Devil =

2016 Dutch documentary film

- Film poster
- Directed by: Pieter van Huystee
- Written by: Pieter van Huystee
- Release date: 19 November 2015
- Running time: 86 minutes
- Country: Netherlands
- Language: Dutch

Hieronymus Bosch, Touched by the Devil (Dutch: Jheronimus Bosch, Touched by the Devil) is a 2015 Dutch documentary film directed by Pieter van Huystee about the Dutch artist Hieronymus Bosch. It documents how The Haywain Triptych is exhibited in Bosch's hometown of 's-Hertogenbosch for the first time in almost 500 years.

The film gives a behind-the-scenes look at how the many paintings in the exhibit Jheronimus Bosch—Visions of Genius were assembled, including visits to Museo del Prado in Madrid and Gallerie dell'Accademia in Venice. A high point occurs when years of research result in The Temptation of Saint Anthony, a small painting at the Nelson-Atkins Museum of Art in Kansas City, being attributed to the hand of Bosch himself.

== Reception ==
The film has a score of 64% on Metacritic. It was listed as one of eleven films that could be selected as the Dutch submission for the Best Foreign-Language Film at the 89th Academy Awards.
