= The Hermit Saints =

Triptych by Hieronymus Bosch

- Artist: Hieronymus Bosch
- Year: c. 1493
- Medium: oil on panel
- Dimensions: 86 cm × 60 cm (34 in × 24 in)
- Location: Gallerie dell'Accademia, Venice

The Hermit Saints is a religious oil on panel painting displayed as a triptych which was painted c. 1493 by the Early Netherlandish artist Hieronymus Bosch. The entirety of the triptych painting measures 86 by 60 centimetres (34 in × 24 in). This artwork is currently being housed at the Gallerie dell'Accademia, Venice.

Saints are a common theme in Bosch's artwork; for him, they are a reference to the living and also to suffering against what was considered sinful. Likewise, there is often the portrayal of brutality and agony that far outweighs the beauty in Bosch's work since he uses saints as a moral paradigm of the artist's time. He represents them as those who are most faithful in their beliefs.

Within this triptych the viewer is introduced to three hermit saints depicted in separate lands of the heavenly and hellish manifestations of mankind's sin and moral obligations. The hermit saints are a reference to the life of solitude and devotion to their faith and practice of the religion Christianity. Each panel is rich with symbolic imagery that gives insight into the frame of mind of each saint's devotion and empathy towards Christ through iconography and symbolism.

== History ==
The triptych is mentioned at the Palazzo Ducale in 1771, as hanging in the Eccelso Tribunale Hall. In 1838 it was removed by the Austrian authorities, then ruling Venice, to the Imperial Gallery of Vienna in Austria, from which, in 1893, it went to the Kunsthistorisches Museum. In 1919 it was returned to Venice.

The work has been badly damaged, perhaps by a fire; in particular, in the central part, the sky, the landscape and the head of St. Jerome have been repainted. The date of 1493 has been confirmed by dendochronological analysis.

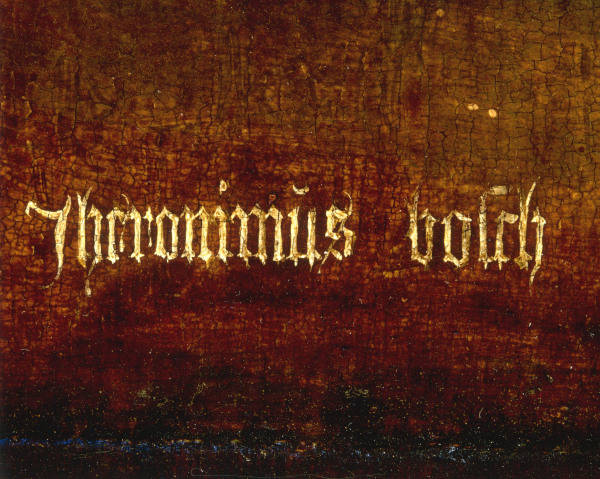
Detail of Bosch's signature.

== Description ==
The depictions of hell, heaven, and earth in Bosch's artwork showcase the varying stages of existence as the panels move from scenes of heaven to Earth, and finally, shift onwards into Bosch's visions of hell. The left panel in The Hermit Saints depicts a hierarchal depiction of hell and each of the hermit saints devotion to Christ.

In the background of the left panel a church, a well, a bridge, two human figures, and carious trees can be seen silhouetted amongst the glow of fires ominous light. Nearest in the foreground resides the first saint, St. Anthony, an older man who is gathering water in a small vessel as he is surrounded by various creatures of hell, both on land and within the small body of water near the man. To the older man's right stands a tree with a white sheet as two smaller human figures push through the sheet to enter the body of water. Within this triptych Saint Anthony appears secluded, a juxtaposition with Bosch's more chaotic depictions of St. Anthony, like that of the Triptych of the Temptation of St. Anthony. In this painting, the saint appears in agony, surrounded by monstrous figures of hell actively attacking one another. The seclusion of the figure in The Hermit Saints connects to the devotion exhibited by the other two saints in second and third panels and likewise, contrasting with the chaotic scenes of passion displayed in the Bosch's Temptation of Saint Anthony.

The middle panel is an Earthly scene with recognizable lifeforms such as deer, birds, and iguanas inhabiting the land. The second saint depicted is St. Jerome, another older man, who can be seen in the midst of worship, as a small crucifix stands slanted before him. To the left of the crucifix is a small relief depicting a human figure and a unicorn. The small relief is echoed as another small column depicts a celestial scene with a human figure bent down on their knees, gazing up to a distinctly separate scene of the sun and the moon. In the entirety of this panel, the faith St. Jerome has for Christ is symbolized by the physical space of the vastness of the land. The focal point of St. Jerome showcases the pain and suffering of Christ, allowing St. Jerome to contemplate and empathize with Christ's experiences with suffering in life.

The third panel portrays third saint, who appears to be St. Giles, who remains dwelling in a cave, deep in prayer with an arrow lodged in his chest, a deer by his feet, and a face peering out of the darkness of the cave.

== Iconography ==
Each of the three panels portrays a different Christian anchorite saint.

Saint Anthony

The left panel portrays St. Anthony the Abbot in a nocturnal landscape. The village in fire is perhaps an allegory of the ergotism plague, or of the saint's alleged capability to quench fires. The saint is collecting the marshy water of a pool with a jar, surrounded by demonic visions such as the naked woman appearing behind a tent in company of several devils. Under her, a devil-fish is pouring wine from a jar, while around it are deformed crickets portrayed in grotesque postures: one is reading a missal, one has a prolonged beak and a peacock tail, while another is composed by a nun head with feet, which carries a little owl and its nest above.

The inclusion of Saint Anthony functions as a moral compass for those within Catholic communities; Saint Anthony represents the action of resisting humanly temptation. Born in Egypt, Saint Anthony was raised within a Christian environment and did not pursue education in his youth. Saint Anthony preferred a life of solitude in his home as well as in his attendance of Church; earlier on in his youth Saint Anthony showed a profound appreciation for his faith. With the death of Saint Anthony's parents in his young adult life, he entered a state of reflection on his walk to church one day and felt he must live an ascetic way of life. Through manual labor Saint Anthony gains the admiration of many, including men who seek him out to obtain his ascetic lifestyle.

Saint Jerome

In the center is Saint Jerome, kneeling in the desert and praying at a crucifix on a stick. The setting is an altar resembling a sculpted Roman sarcophagus, located within a ruined oratory. The reliefs depicts scenes connected to the redemption theme, such as Judith and Holophernes (symbolizing the victory of the soul, or Mary killing the devil), a knight and a unicorn, symbol of virginity. In the lower part is a man diving into a beehive and covering himself with honey, perhaps an allusion to carnal love or to alchemic mercury. This detail is depicted in a drawing housed in the Albertina in Vienna. All around are symbols of evil, scattered in a desert and dark landscape and surrounded by a sinister vegetation. They include, at left, a column with an idolater adoring the atmospheric phenomena, skeletons, monstrous animals fighting each other and dried bush. At right are instead Jerome's traditional symbols, the red cardinal's hat and the lion, identifiable with the bony animal drinking at the pool.

The rise of imagery of Saint Jerome was significant within the Catholic art community, specifically for Dutch Catholic artists. The hermit saints are a reference to the navigation of devotion and virtue within a solitary way of life. Saint Jerome imposed a vision of philosophical devotion and intellect, Saint Jerome's studies allowed him to travel through Rome, Trier, and finally Chalcis, a desert surrounding Antioch. The studies of Saint Jerome included Greek and Hebrew and upon his return to Rome, his language efforts allowed him to adapt the Latin Gospels for Pope Damasus I. Later, Saint Jerome translated texts from the Hebrew Bible into Latin and he became recognized within Catholic communities for his scholarly efforts and thus celebrated for these efforts.

Saint Giles

The right panel shows Saint Giles, who is praying in a grotto; this houses a roll which, according to the Golden Legend, contained all the names of those to be saved thanks to his intercession. The saint has been shot by an arrow, originally destined for the fawn at his feet. The landscape, the less dark of the triptych, is dominated by a sharp rock.

Known as a “Patron of Beggars” and a “Patron Saint of Cripples”, the imagery of Saint Giles provides something of hope for miracles most notable to those in physical need. From early life, he was known for the display of his appreciation and ambition for life. Originally from Greece, his parentage may have been that of royalty. Saint Giles received a superior education in contrast to that of Saint Anthony and Saint Jerome. After the death of his parents, Saint Giles gave many of his earthly belongings to people within poor communities as a means of proving his holiness. He was famous for healing those with disabilities.

== Painting materials ==
The scientists at The Bosch Research and Conservation Project investigated all the technical aspects of this triptych. Bosch employed the usual pigments of the Renaissance period, such as azurite, lead-tin-yellow, vermilion and ochres omitting the expensive natural ultramarine.

== See also ==
- List of paintings by Hieronymus Bosch
