= The Temptation of St Anthony (Bosch) =

Painting by Hieronymus Bosch or by a follower

The Temptation of St. Anthony
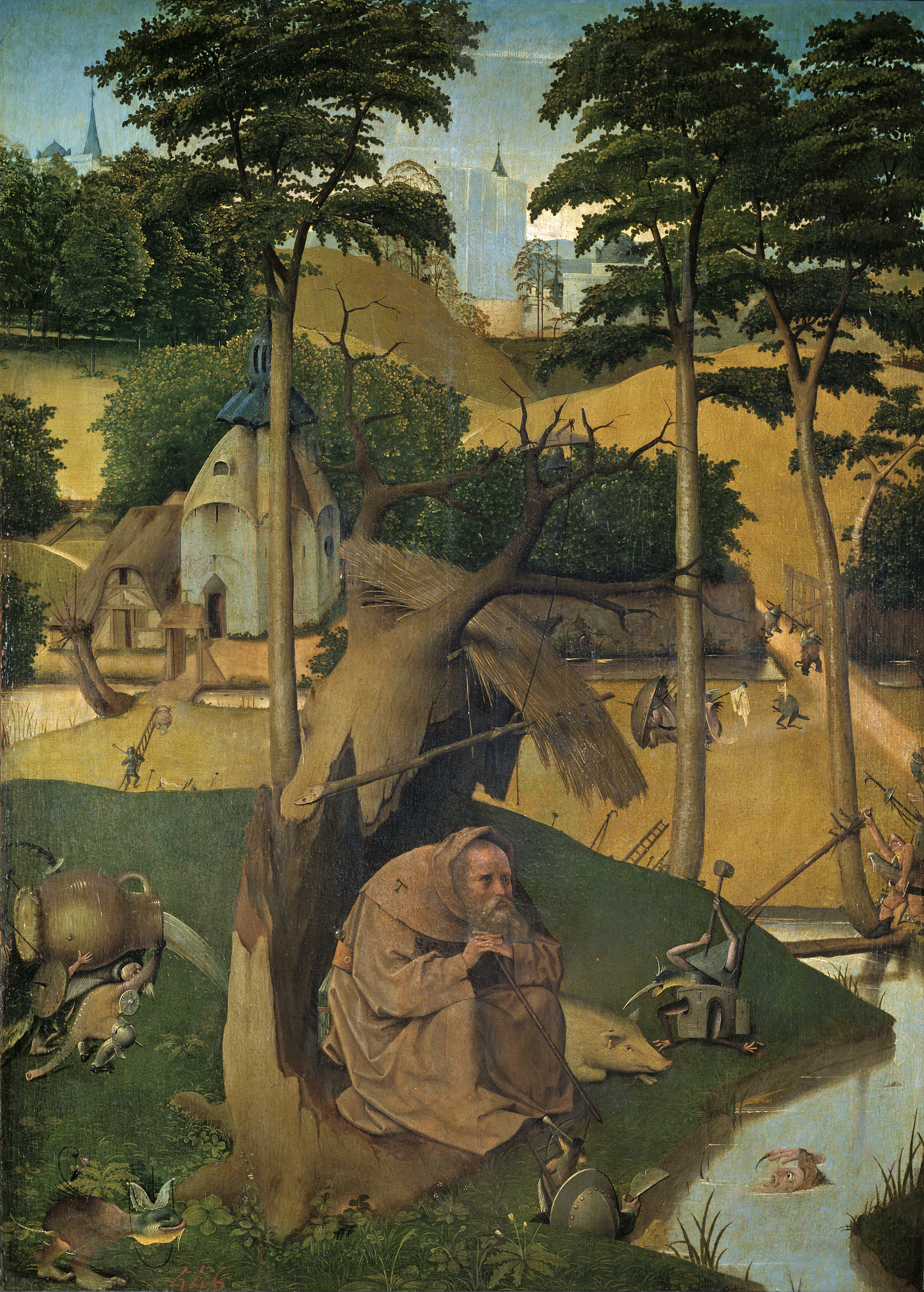
- Artists: Hieronymus Bosch, or follower
- Year: c. 1500–1525
- Type: Oil on panel
- Dimensions: 73 cm × 52.5 cm (29 in × 20.7 in)
- Location: Museo del Prado, Madrid

The Temptation of St. Anthony is a painting of disputed authorship, attributed to either the Early Netherlandish artist Hieronymus Bosch or a follower. It is now in the Museo del Prado, in Madrid.

== History ==
The work was in the Escorial monastery, although it was not mentioned in inventories; later it was moved to the Prado. It is likely that the work was one of the Temptations sent to the monastery by Philip II of Spain in 1574. This painting has a more serene atmosphere than the triptych with the same theme now in the Museu Nacional de Arte Antiga of Lisbon.

Like much of Bosch's works, it cannot be dated with precision, although it is likely from his late production (1500–1516).

In 2016, the Bosch Research and Conservation project, after five years of researching all known Bosch paintings, announced that they had significant doubts about the attribution of the work to Bosch, instead attributing it to a follower.

== Description ==
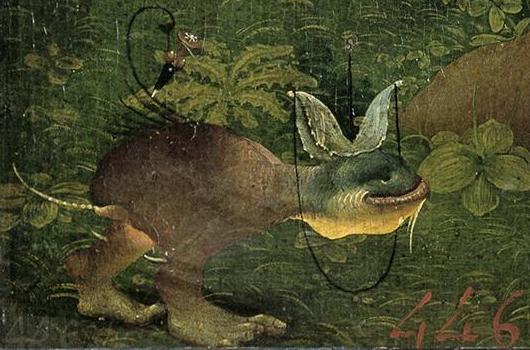
Detail

St. Anthony the Abbot is portrayed in meditation, in a sunny landscape near the trunk of a dry tree. St. Anthony is a recurrent figure in Bosch's work, with up to 15 paintings of this subject, all inspired by legends told in the Golden Legend and in his Life by Athanasius of Alexandria. He is represented in a setting of solitude and temptation that the saint experienced over twenty years. Although this picture is significantly different from other works by Bosch of St. Anthony, such as the triptych painting of the same name, customary features of the abbot include his dark brown habit with the Greek letter "tau" and a pig by his side.

In contrast to the earlier paintings with St. Anthony, this version of the temptation of St. Anthony finds the abbot calmer from his meditative spirit. His surroundings are peaceful and evoke a sense of calm. The pig lies next to him like a pet. Once demons, the creatures of temptation are now more like goblins and do not disturb the peaceful feeling of the painting.

This painting, originally framed with a semi-circular arch, was one of Bosch's later works, from sometime after 1490. Philip II of Spain sent it to the Monastery of El Escorial near Madrid. From there the painting came to the Museo del Prado as part of the Royal Collection.

== See also ==
- Triptych of the Temptation of St. Anthony
- List of paintings by Hieronymus Bosch

== Sources ==
- Varallo, Franca (2004). Bosch. Milan: Skira. ISBN 978-88-572-0615-8.
