= Flemish Art Collection =

Partnership between three art historical museums in Flanders

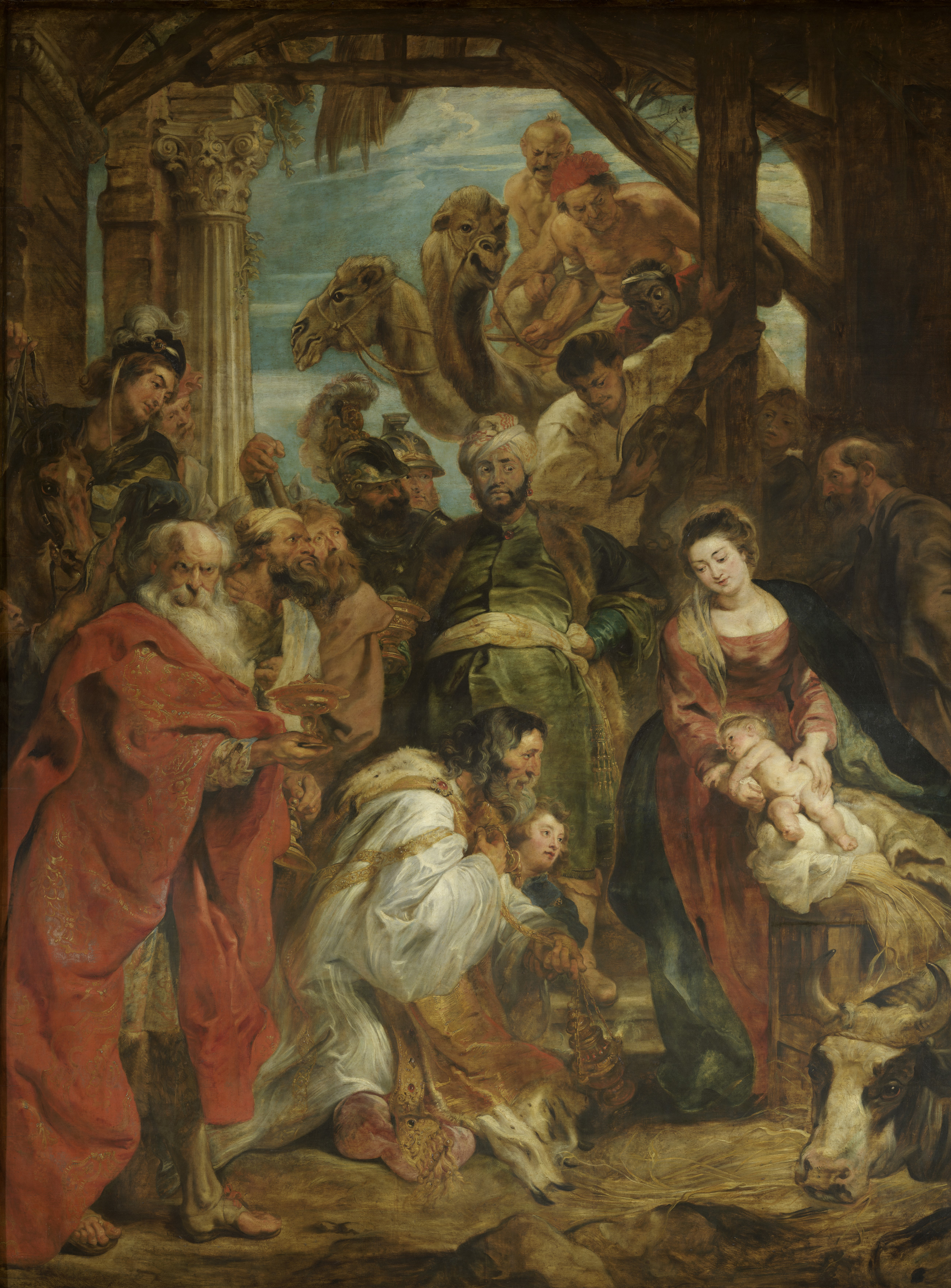
Adoration of the Magi. Peter Paul Rubens, Royal Museum of Fine Arts, Antwerp. c. 1624

The Flemish Art Collection (Dutch: Vlaamse kunstcollectie) is a partnership between three museums in Flanders, Belgium: the Royal Museum of Fine Arts Antwerp, the Groeningemuseum in Bruges, and the Museum of Fine Arts, Ghent.

The Groeningemuseum specialises in the 15th and 16th century Early Netherlandish period and contains a number of works by Jan van Eyck, Dirk Bouts, Gerard David and Hieronymus Bosch, the Royal Museum of Fine Arts in the baroque, including works by Peter Paul Rubens and Anthony van Dyck while the Museum of Fine Arts, Ghent focuses on 19th-century art, including of Théodore Géricault, Gustave Courbet and Auguste Rodin.

The body is responsible for publishing the comprehensive website / database vlaamseprimitieven, which, since 2011, catalogue writings and images related to the Flemish Primitives.
