= Triptych of the Temptation of St. Anthony =

1501 painting by Hieronymus Bosch

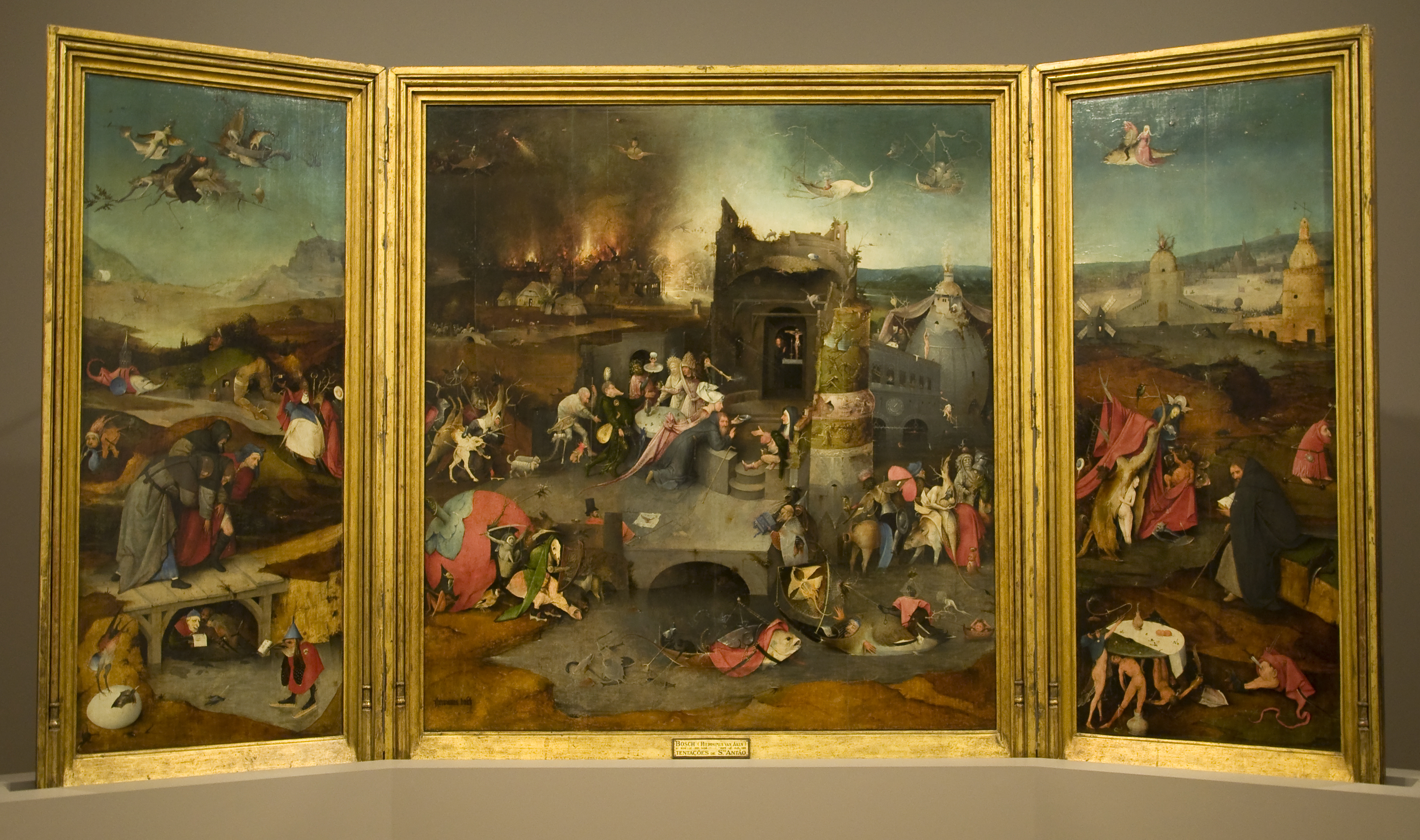
- Artist: Hieronymus Bosch
- Year: c. 1501
- Medium: Oil on panel
- Dimensions: 131 cm × 228 cm (52 in × 90 in)
- Location: Museu Nacional de Arte Antiga, Lisbon

The Triptych of Temptation of St. Anthony is an oil painting on wood panels by the Early Netherlandish painter Hieronymus Bosch, dating from around 1501. The work portrays the mental and spiritual torments endured by Saint Anthony the Great (Anthony Abbot), one of the most prominent of the Desert Fathers of Egypt in the late 3rd and early 4th centuries. The Temptation of St. Anthony was a popular subject in Medieval and Renaissance art. In common with many of Bosch's works, the triptych contains much fantastic imagery. The painting hangs in the Museu Nacional de Arte Antiga, in Lisbon.

== History ==
According to some historians, the work could be one of the three Temptations recorded in the inventory of Philip II of Spain sent to the Escorial in 1574. From the 1950s, it had traditionally been considered more likely that the triptych was bought by the Portuguese humanist Damião de Góis between 1523 and 1545. In fact, the painting was documented as part of the collections in the Royal Palace of Lisbon in 1872 March from Spain, and in 1911, it was donated it to its current museum.

Although the painting has usually been attributed to the period 1490–1500, dendochronologic analysis has assigned it to around 1501.

Like many of Bosch's paintings, The Temptation of St. Anthony was the subject of a number of copies. A workshop copy is in Royal Museums of Fine Arts of Belgium and a later copy is in Gemäldegalerie, Berlin. Reduced copy of two wings is in Prado Museum in Madrid. Another version of the central panel is found in MASP in São Paulo, Brazil, first rehearsal Version. Circle of Jheronimus Bosch, Temptation of Saint Anthony central panel copy, (Barnes Foundation), a work by a follower after Bosch can be found in the National Gallery of Canada in Ottawa.

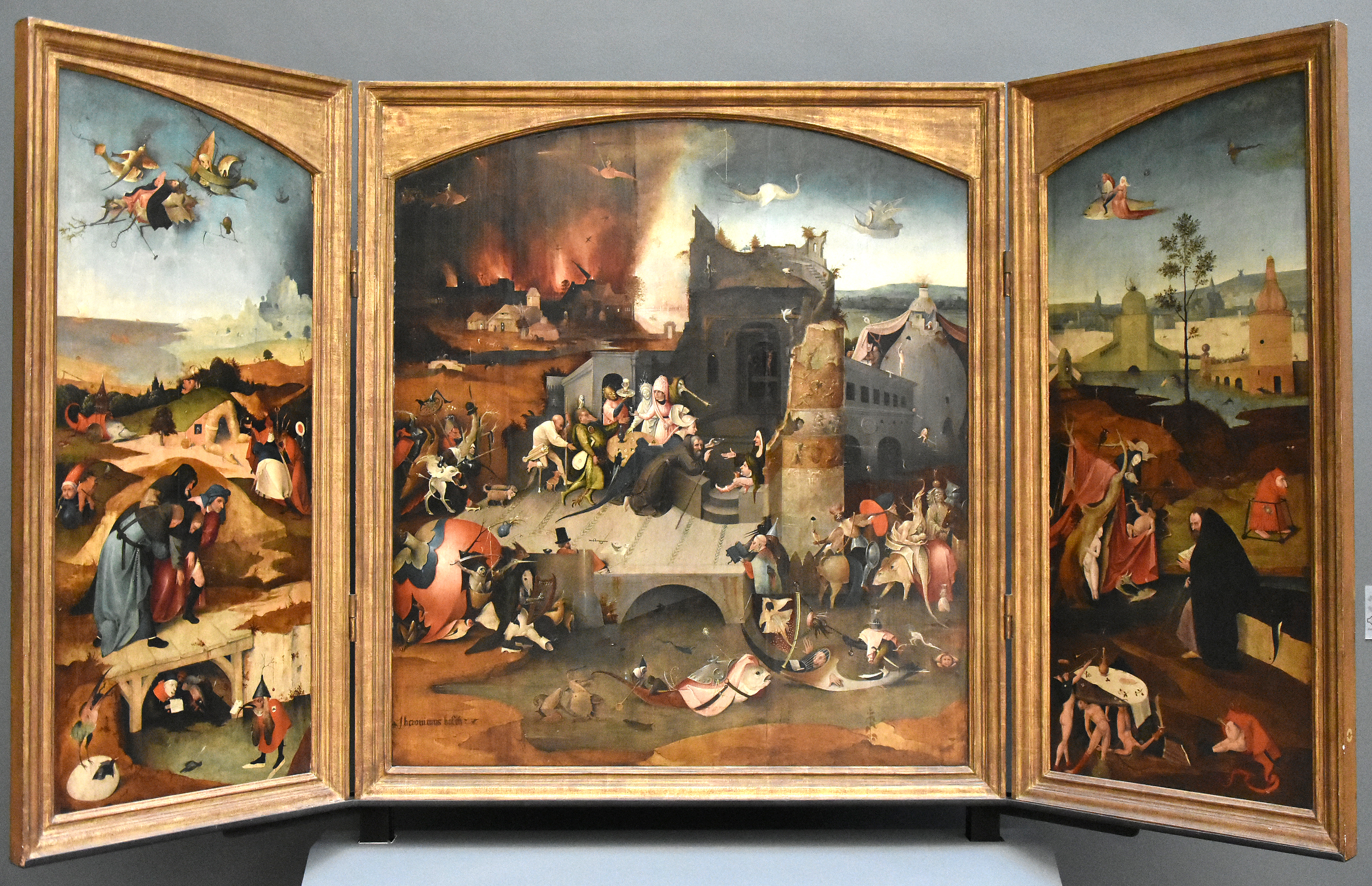
Temptation of Saint Anthony, WORKSHOP OF BOSCH, Royal Museums of Fine Arts of Belgium

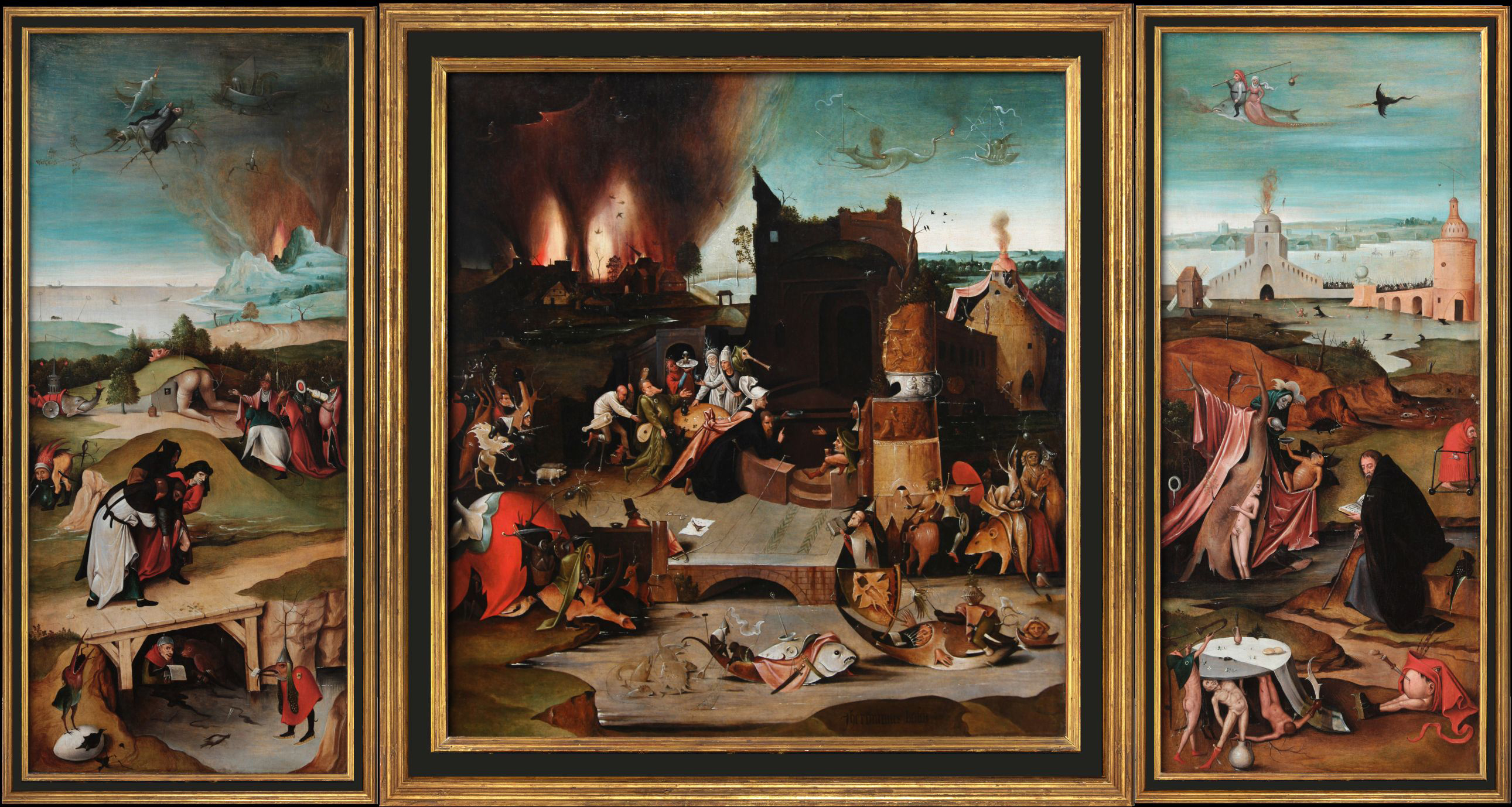
Temptation of Saint Anthony, Later Copy, Gemäldegalerie, Berlin

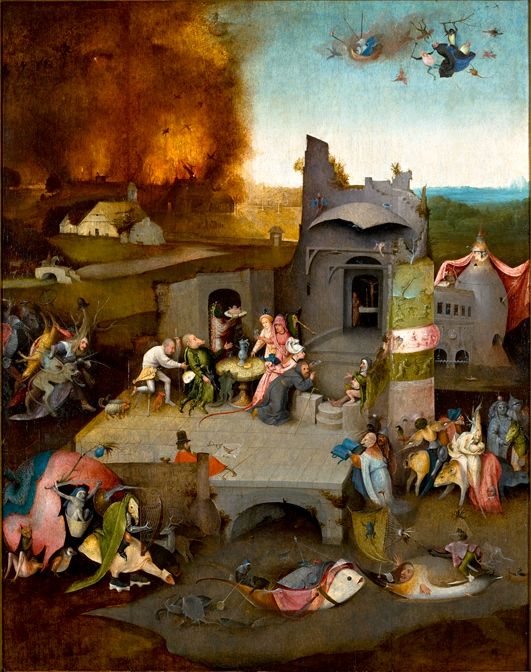
Temptation of Saint Anthony, first rehearsal Version, São Paulo, Brasil

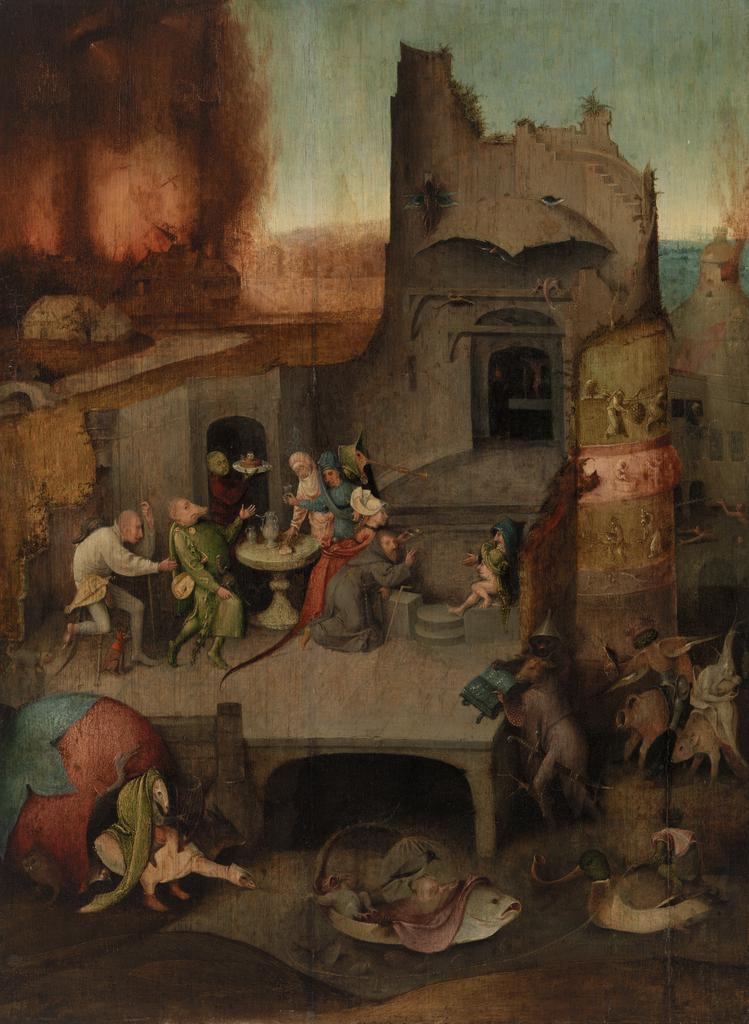
Circle of Jheronimus Bosch, Temptation of Saint Anthony central panel copy, (Barnes Foundation)

== Description ==
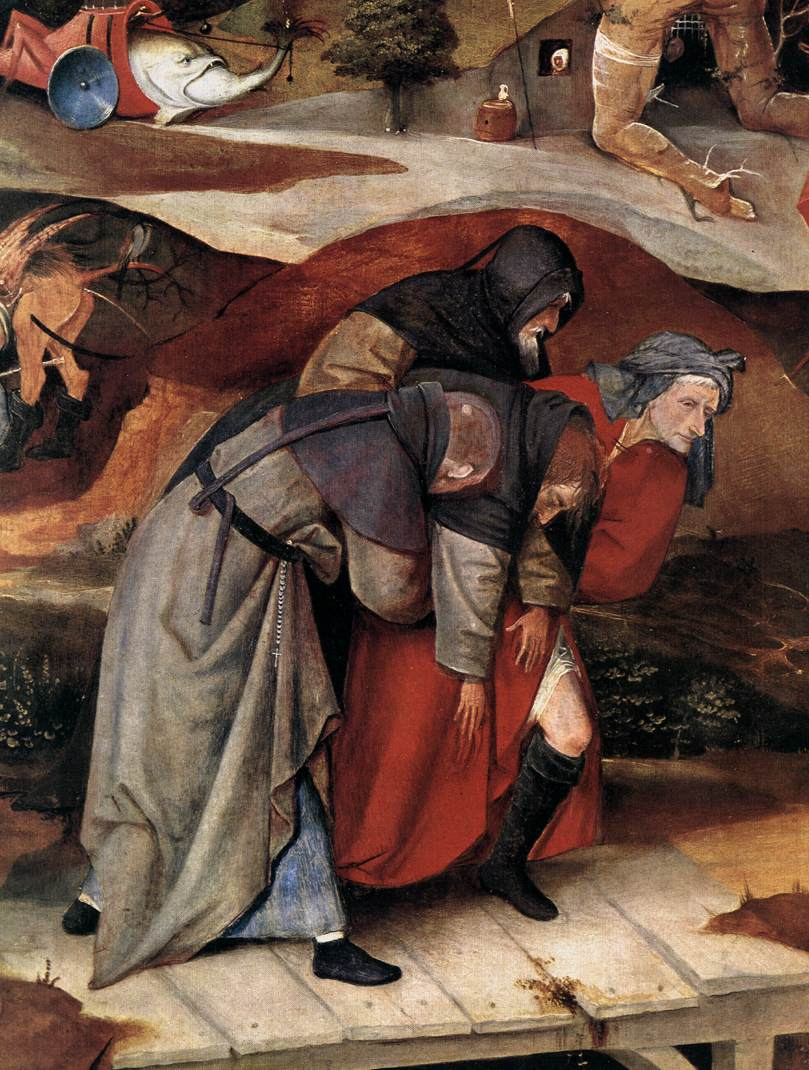
Detail of the left panel showing St Anthony supported by two monks and a lay-man

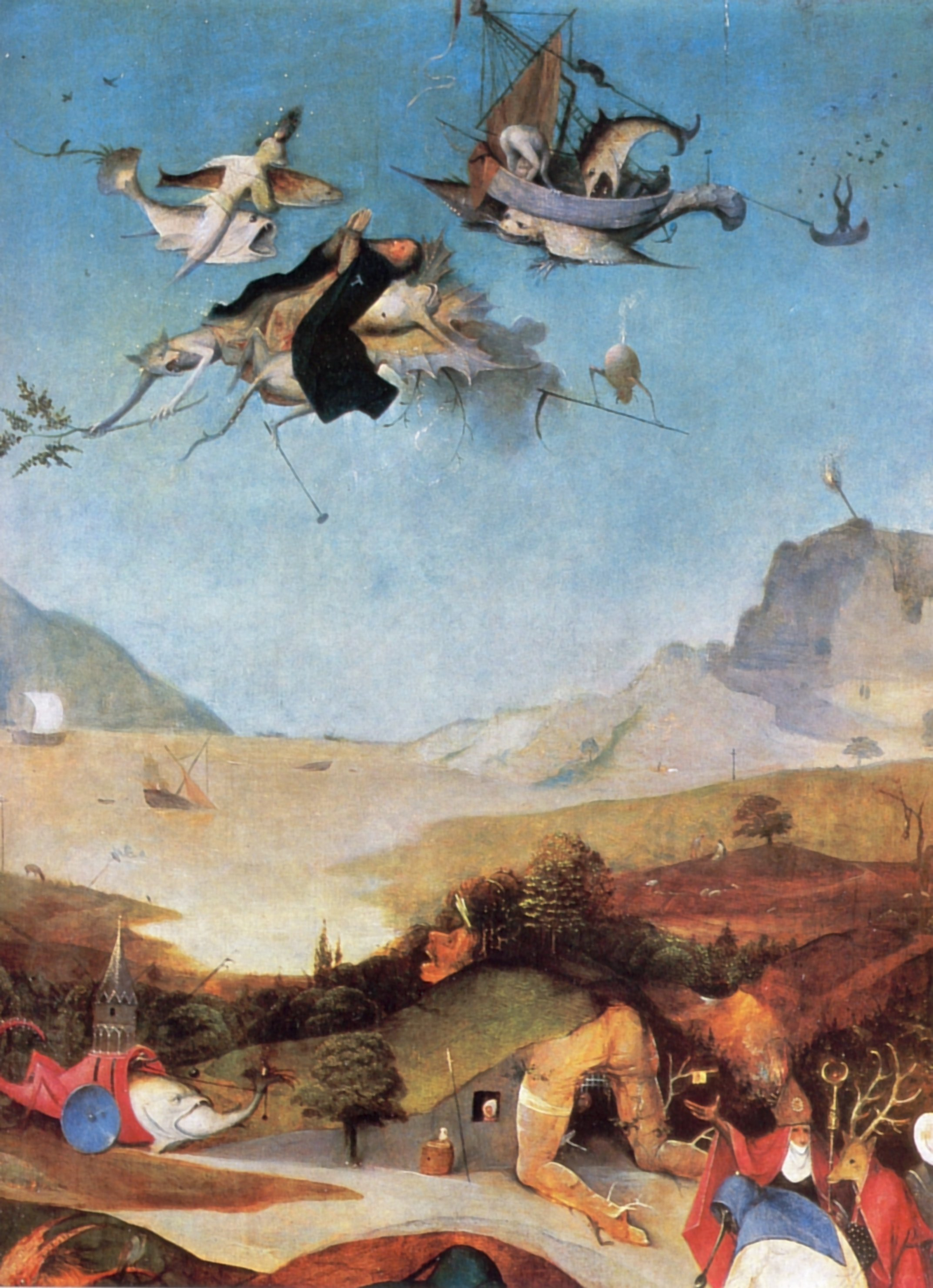
Detail showing St Anthony carried into the sky by demons

The Temptation of St. Anthony is an oil painting on three wooden panels, having the form of a triptych, the two outer panels being hinged shutters to the central section. The centre panel measures 131.5 by 119 cm, and the wings measure 131.5 by 53 cm.

The work tells symbolically the story of the mental and spiritual torments endured by St. Anthony Abbot throughout his life. The sources for the subjects were Athanasius of Alexandria's Life of St. Anthony, which had been popularized in Flanders by Pieter van Os, and Jacopo da Varazze's Golden Legend.

=== Left panel ===
The left panel portrays the legendary flight and the fall of St. Anthony. In the sky, the saint is brought down by a host of demons. Below, is the saint's grotto (or a brothel), carved within a hill in the shape of a man on all fours, whose backside forms the entrance. An impious procession is directed towards the latter, led by a demon wearing holy vestments and by a deer. In the foreground is a tired-out Anthony, supported after the fall by a monk and a layman; the latter has been traditionally identified as Bosch himself.

Under the bridge which crosses an icy lake are three figures, one of which is a monk reading a letter. Also on the lake is a demon bird with skates: its beak holds a cartouche with the word "fat". This could be a reference to the simony scandal.

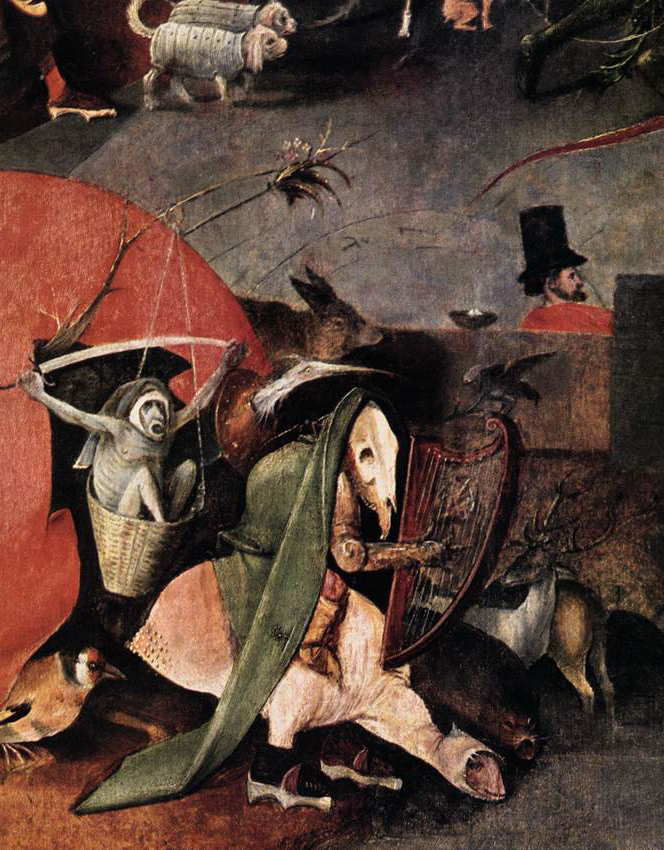
Detail of the central panel including the man in a top hat

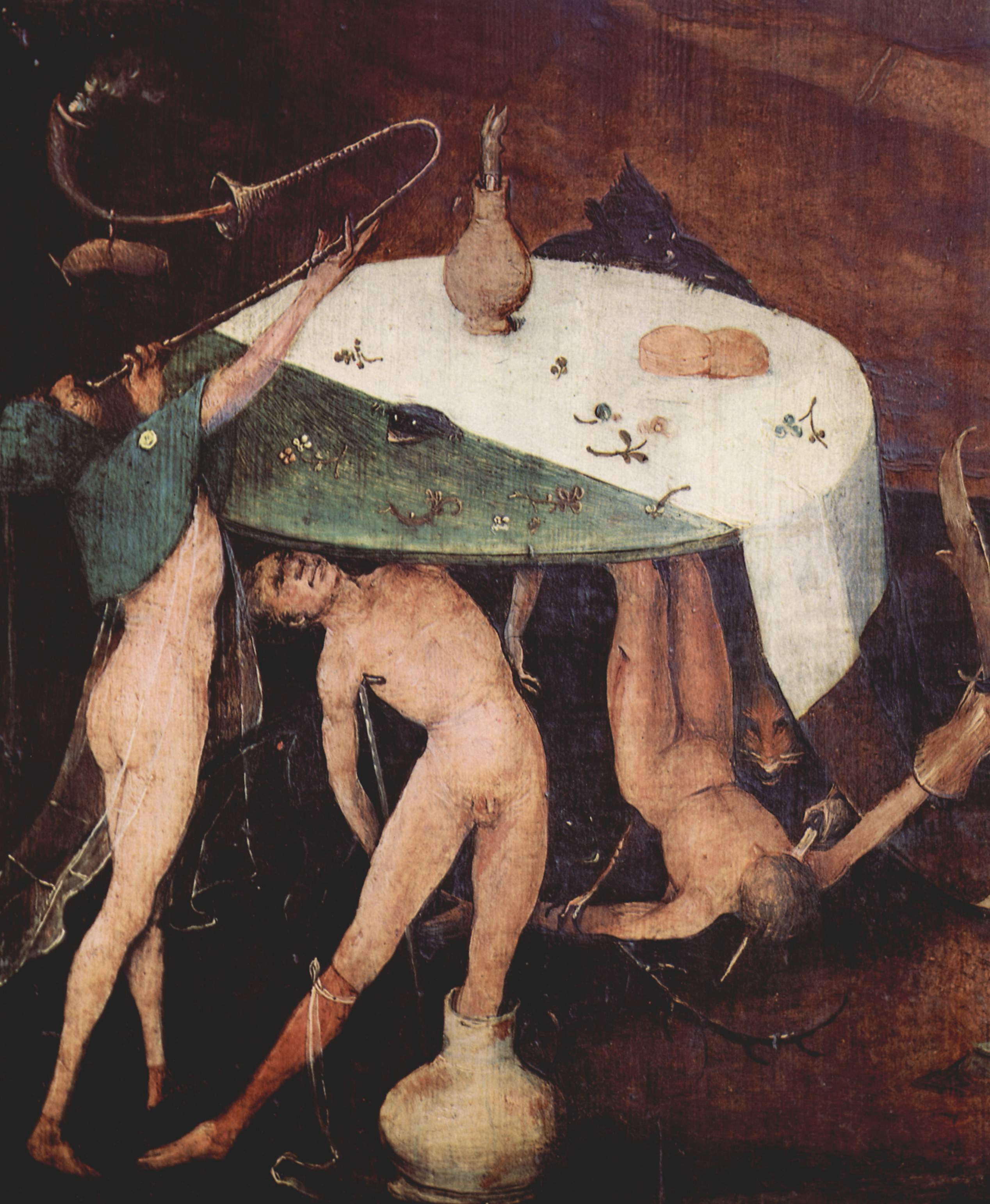
Detail of the right panel showing the table of luxury

=== Central panel ===
The center panel exemplifies Bosch's attraction to the saintly ability of refusing temptation. It depicts the temptation of St. Anthony scene proper. At the center is the saint in contemplation, with a blessing hand pointing at his small cell inside a ruined tower where a miniature Christ appears to point at the Crucifix, to suggest the true sacrifice in reply to the profanatory mass celebrated by demons and priestess at his left. A black-skinned priestess holds a vessel with a toad, a symbol of witchcraft as well as of luxury; the animal in turns holds an egg. A black-dressed singer has a pig face and a little owl (an allegory of heresy) above his head, while a crippled man is going to receive the communion. The saint looks out into the world while pointing in the direction of Christ; no one in the panel (world) is looking in His direction.

The background shows, at left, a city on fire, a traditional symbol of the protection granted by Anthony against ergotism and fire. The monks of the Order of St. Anthony specialized in the treatment and care of victims of ergotism (also known as St. Anthony's fire), who experienced burning sensations and hallucinations.

The demon group at the left, including a woman wearing a helmet resembling a hollow tree, may symbolize the bloody violence. The group in the water at right may be a devilish parody of either the flight into Egypt or the Adoration of the Magi; a third demonic group is emerging from the red fruit in the foreground. This group includes a devil who is playing a harp and riding a chicken, and another devil appears to be moving around the fish-boat at the center.

Visible in the sky is a ship-shaped bird, flying fish and winged boats. The bearded man with a top hat could be the wizard thought responsible for the visions.

In another interpretation, much of the images relate to ergotism and the forms of treatment at the time of Bosch. The large fruit can be interpreted as a mandrake apple and the man wielding the sword can be seen as a reference to the uprooting ceremony. Mandrake root was used often as a protection against ergotism, and the fruit was used as an anesthetic, which helped with necessary amputations resulting from disease. The natural anesthetic also could kill the patients if given too much, and it also caused hallucinations of its own in addition to the hallucinations of ergotism, giving meaning to the violent nature of the characters surrounding the fruit in the panel. The images of fish and thistle relate to alchemy from the time and other 'cold' elements used to counter the 'hot' malady.

=== Right panel ===
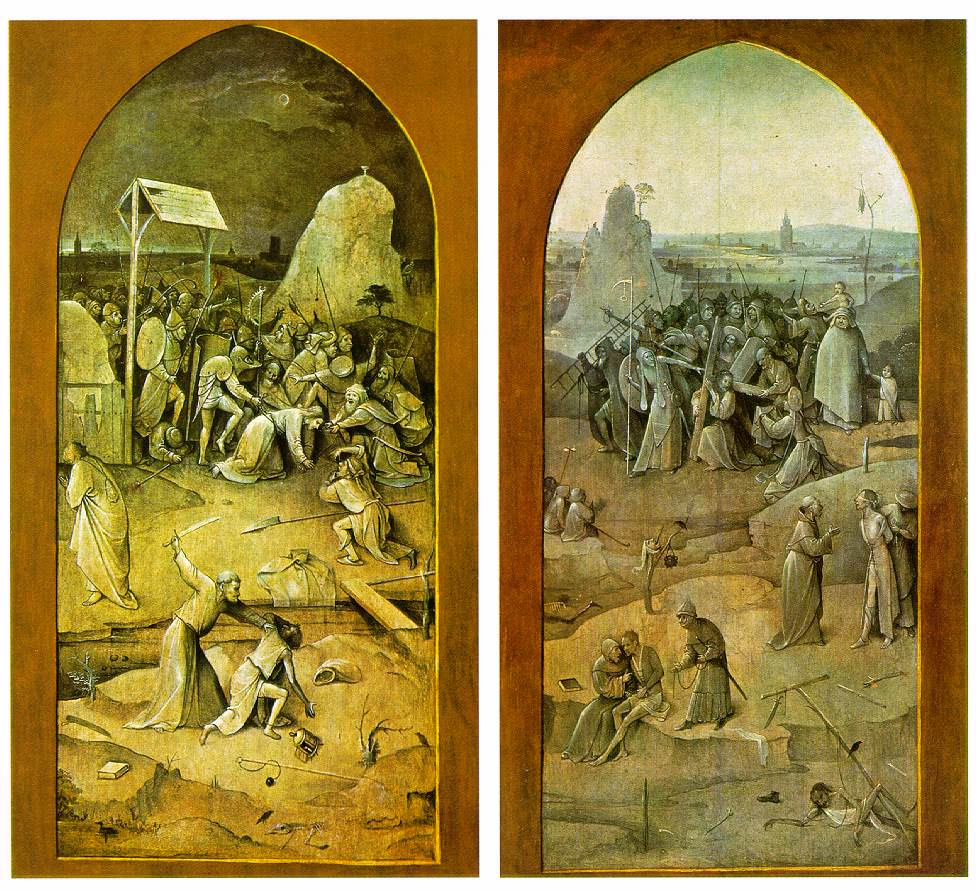
The closed triptych showing the Arrest of Christ and Christ carrying the cross

The right panel depicts the Contemplation of St. Anthony. The two figures riding the fish in the sky had, according to the legend, obtained the capability to fly by the Devil in order to partake in Witches' Sabbaths.

In the foreground is a naked woman, a symbol of luxury. She is peeping from a hollow trunk through a tent, which is being kept open for her by a toad. Her tempting body is being offered to the saint, who is portrayed at right, contemplating while looking at the observer at the same time. The dwarf next to him, who wears a red mantle and a whirligig, is a symbol of humanity's fecklessness. In the foreground, finally, are the last temptations: a table with bread and a jar of vine, supported by naked demons. One of the human pillars has his foot caught in a jar — an allusion to the act of sexual intercourse.

The background includes a towered city, windmills and a lake.

=== Shutters ===
As usual in other similar Flemish works of the time, the exteriors of the shutters are painted in grisaille. By tradition, in many churches artworks are covered, and altarpieces with wings are closed in the week before Easter. The subdued coloration and the subject matter of the shutter exteriors of this triptych are in keeping with the Lenten theme.

The left panel shows the Arrest of Christ, including, in the foreground, St. Peter cutting Malchus's ear and, in the background, the soldiers are surrounding a fallen Jesus; at the left is Judas fleeing after his kiss.

The right panel portrays Christ Carrying the Cross in the background, while the foreground depicts the two thieves, one confessing and the other refusing to convert. Around Jesus is a crowd, in which figures such as Simon of Cyrene, who is supporting the cross, and the Veronica, can be identified.

== See also ==
- List of paintings by Hieronymus Bosch

== Sources ==
- Varallo, Franca (2004). Bosch. Milan: Skira.
- Ilsink, Matthijs; Koldeweij, Jos (2016). Hieronymus Bosch: Painter and Draughtsman – Catalogue raisonné. Mercatorfonds nv. ISBN 9789462301139.
- Hieronymus Bosch, The Temptation of Saint Anthony, ColourLex
