= Jesus Christ Carrying the Cross =

Statue in Salt Lake City, Utah

- Artist: Michael A. Hall
- Year: 2026
- Type: Sculpture
- Medium: Bronze
- Subject: Jesus Christ Carrying the Cross
- Location: Salt Lake City, Utah, United States; 40.7706°N 111.8910°W
- Owner: The Church of Jesus Christ of Latter-day Saints

Jesus Christ Carrying the Cross is a statue located on Temple Square in Salt Lake City, Utah. It depicts Jesus Christ carrying the cross on his way to his crucifixion, as told in the Gospel of John from the Bible. The statue was sculpted by American artist Michael A. Hall and was unveiled in March 2026.
