= Christ Carrying the Cross (Titian) =

Painting by Titian or Giorgione

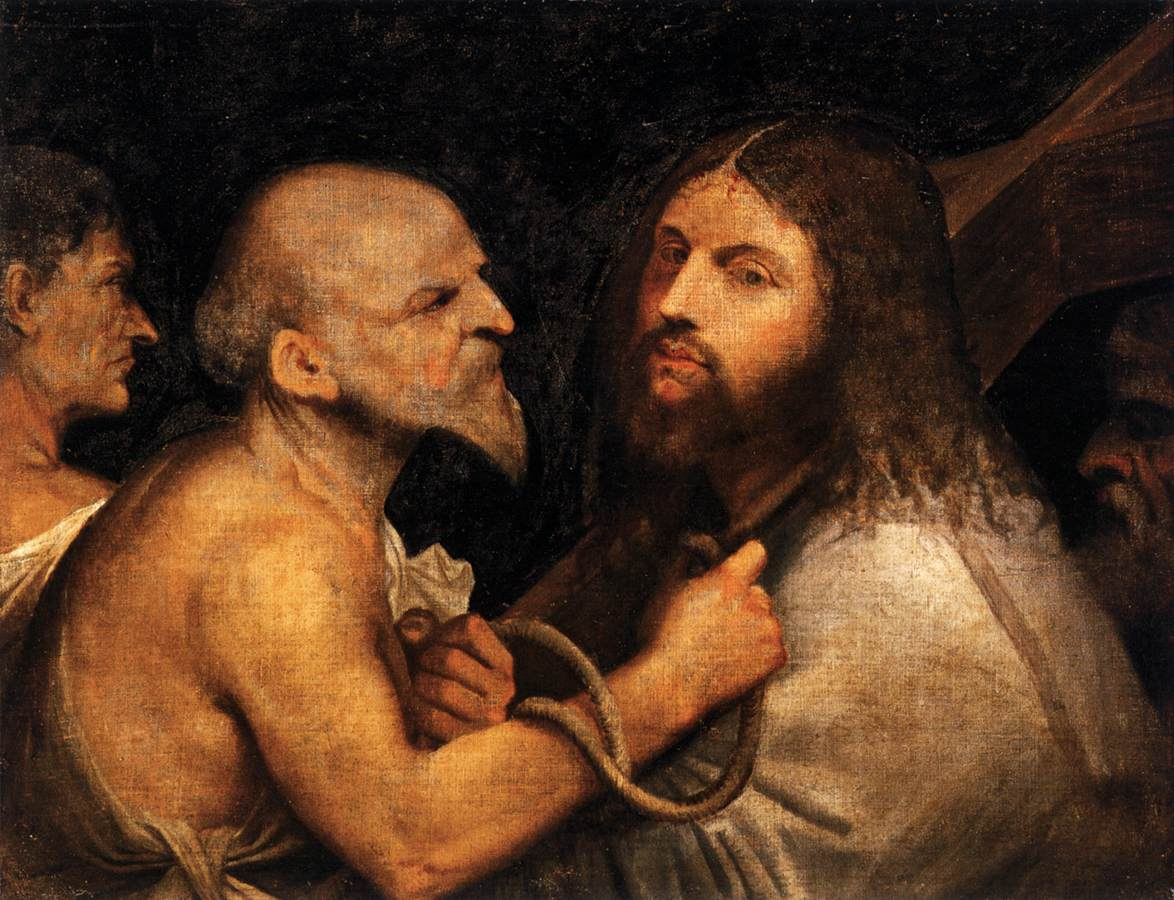
- Artist: Titian or Giorgione
- Year: c. 1505–1507
- Medium: Oil on canvas
- Dimensions: 68.2 cm × 88.3 cm (26.9 in × 34.8 in)
- Location: Scuola Grande di San Rocco; Venice

Christ Carrying the Cross is an oil painting attributed to either Titian or Giorgione. It is dated to about 1505. The painting is housed in the Scuola Grande di San Rocco in Venice, Italy. There are several later versions of the subject by Titian.

== History ==
The painting is mentioned in several historical documents, since it has been the subject of veneration and devotion, due to its alleged miraculous properties. It was originally located in the church of San Rocco, annexed to the eponymous Scuola where it is now, although it is unknown if it was on a pillar near the high altar or in a side chapel.

The attribution of the work has been disputed since the 16th century: Giorgio Vasari in both the first (1550) and second (1568) edition of his Lives assigns it to Giorgione and Titian at the same time. Further, both Titian and Giorgione had a connection with the guild which held the church and the Scuola; Giorgione was a friend of painter Vincenzo Catena, a member of the guild.

The composition inspired numerous painters in Veneto and Lombardy, such as Lorenzo Lotto, Giovanni Bellini and Andrea Solario.

== Description ==
Jesus is portrayed with a cross on his shoulder, against a dark background, while an executioner is holding a noose on his neck. At the side are two secondary figures. Jesus, with a doleful expression, is looking towards the seer. The profile of the executioner and of the side figures were perhaps inspired by Leonardo da Vinci's drawings, which would be part of Venetian collections at the time. Although the subject of Christ Carrying the Cross had long been common for Italian art, Titian was following a type of "close-up" composition that had only recently been introduced to Northern Italy, from German or northern European examples.

The painting features elements which were typical of both Titian and Giorgione: the sfumato contour of the figures and the inhomogeneous colors were common in the latter's works, while the robustness of the characters and their active participation to the event (differently than the quasi-dreaming contemplation of Giorgione) are a Titian hallmark.

== Versions ==
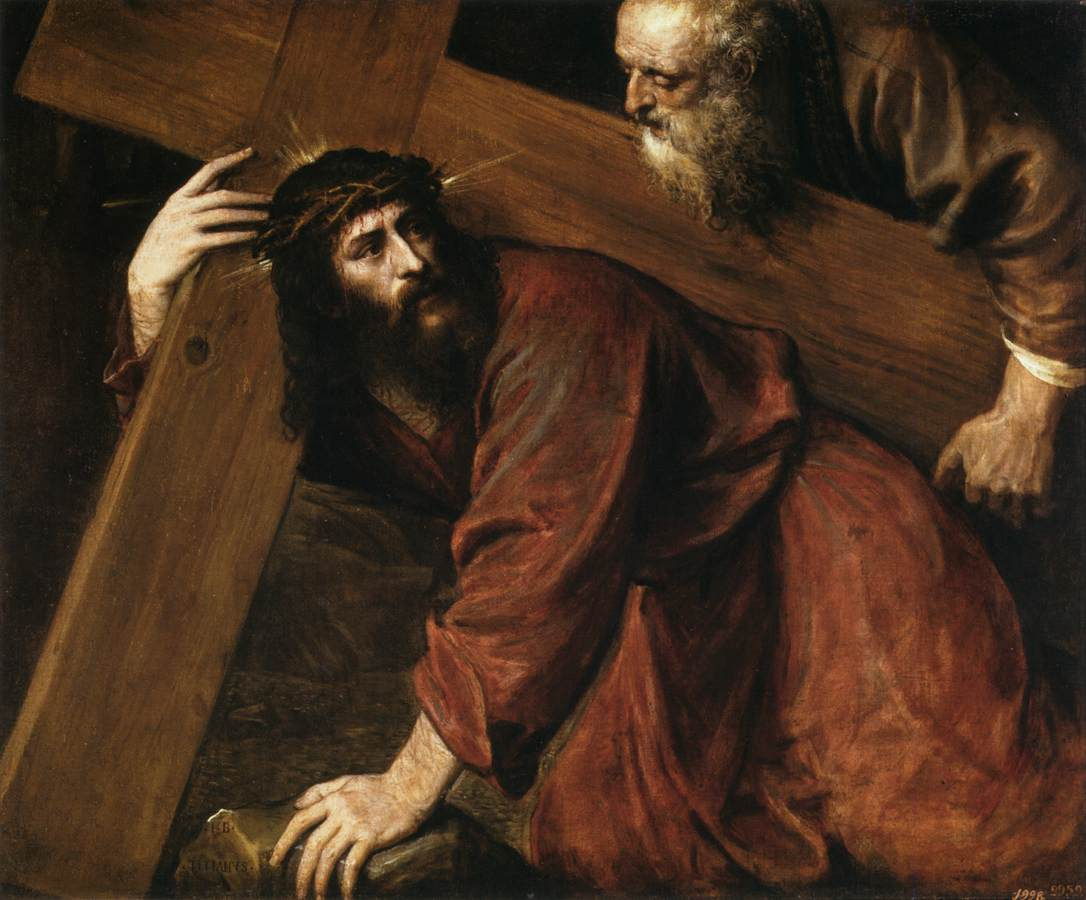
Version in the Museo del Prado, c. 1560 (98 x 116 cm)

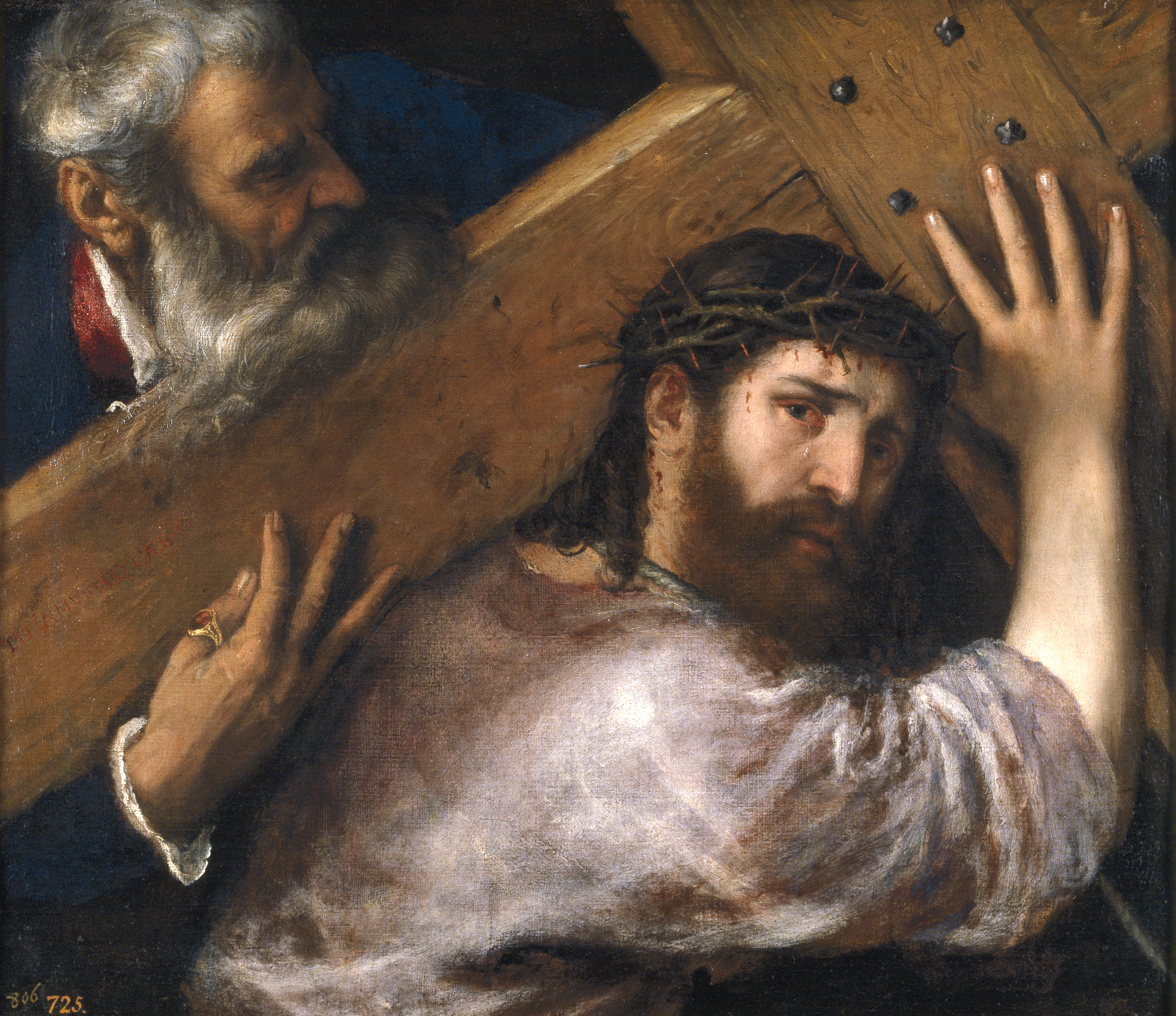
Another version in the Museo del Prado, c. 1565 (67 x 77 cm)

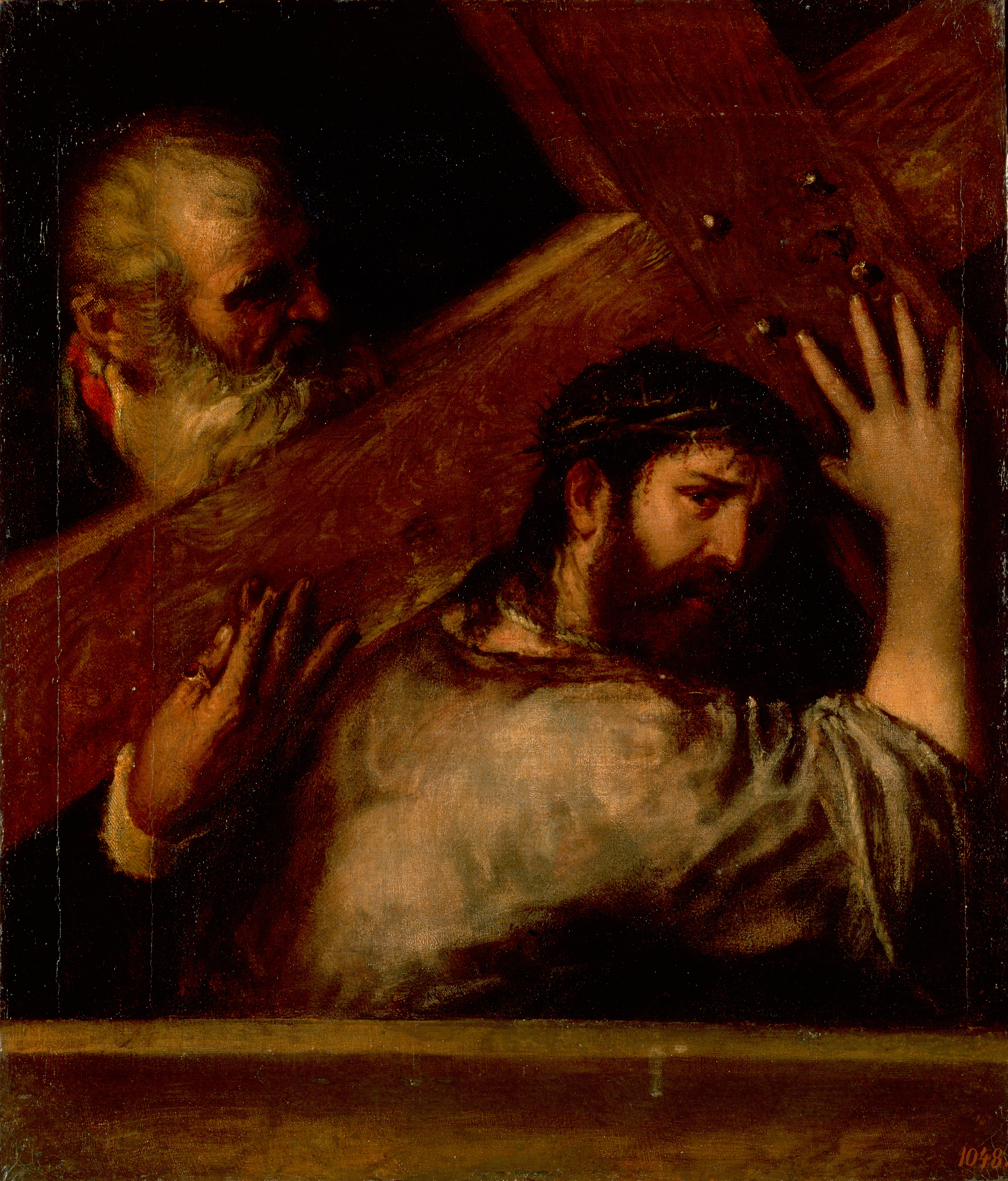
Version in the Hermitage Museum, c. 1565 (89 x 77 cm)

== See also ==
- List of works by Titian
