= Christ Carrying the Cross (El Greco, New York) =

Painting by El Greco

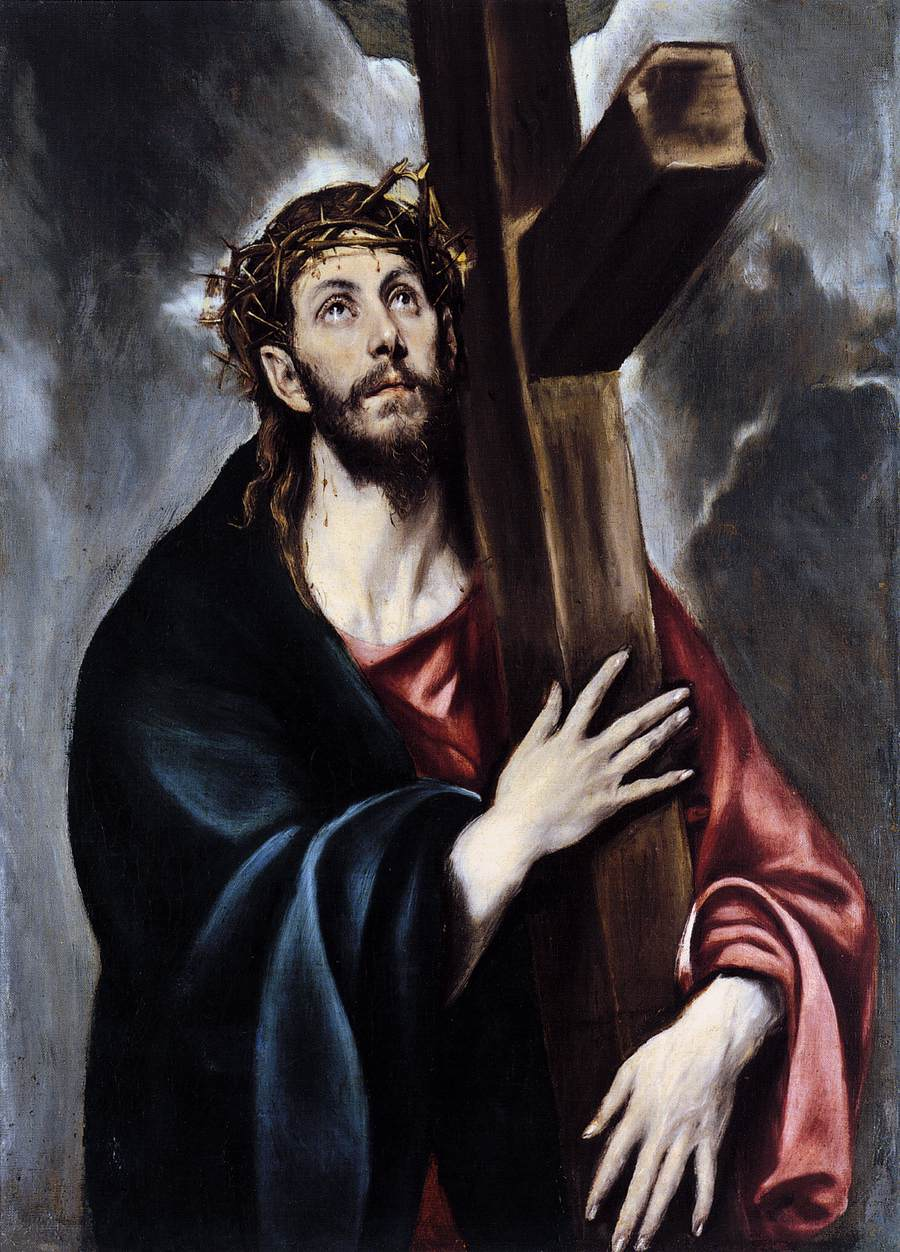
- Artist: El Greco
- Year: 1580
- Medium: oil on canvas
- Dimensions: 105 cm × 79 cm (41 in × 31 in)
- Location: Metropolitan Museum of Art, New York
- Accession: 1975.1.145

Christ Carrying the Cross is an oil painting by El Greco, produced early in his Toledo period circa de 1580. The picture depicts Christ in a moment of personal reflection as he carries the cross to his death, therefore committing the ultimate sacrifice for humankind. In the painting, Christ's eyes are lifted up to the heavens as he begins his walk towards his crucifixion. His gentle hands wrap around the cross as a stormy night floods the background. Christ Carrying the Cross is an oil painting, 105x79cm. The painting, one of numerous similar paintings by El Greco, is currently in the El Greco room in the New York art collection of the Metropolitan Museum of Art.

== El Greco ==
=== Summary of life ===
Born in 1541 in Crete, El Greco's official name is Doménikos Theotokópoulos. El Greco acquired this name while living in Italy, no doubt studying the classical style of art. In Italy, El Greco lived in Venice, and studied under Titian, one of the most profound Italian Renaissance artists. After three years, El Greco moved from Venice to Rome to continue his studies and works under the patronage of Cardinal Alessandro Farnese. While in Rome, Greco continued to develop his own personal artistic style, combining the styles of the Byzantine era, the Renaissance era, and the Mannerist era. To read a full version of El Greco's life, history, and artistic style click here.

=== Painting style and technique ===
Because he combined the stylistic ideas of three different eras and conceptions of art, El Greco's paintings were truly unique. Overall, they captivated a new essence about the idea of the body. Greco's figures often were lengthy, elongated forms that felt almost fluid in nature. His painting usually carried the notion of Romanticism, focusing on the suffering and love through pain and contention. El Greco also was inspired by the techniques and ideals of the Renaissance period, specifically the idea that a perfect human body was a pure connection to the divine. Most of Greco's works featured figures that related to this divine and iconoclastic sense of being. However, El Greco's figures were often distorted and elongated, contrasting the sheer proportionate perfection of the Renaissance bodily form. Instead, his paintings and works connected to a divine presence by through strong, visual, emotional appeals. This reflection of strong and purposeful emotion stems from the Mannerist age, captivating the idea of an aggressive, emotional, and almost violent perspective and strong emotional whirlwind to captive the narration and feeling behind the piece. This was often the structural layout in most of Greco's works.

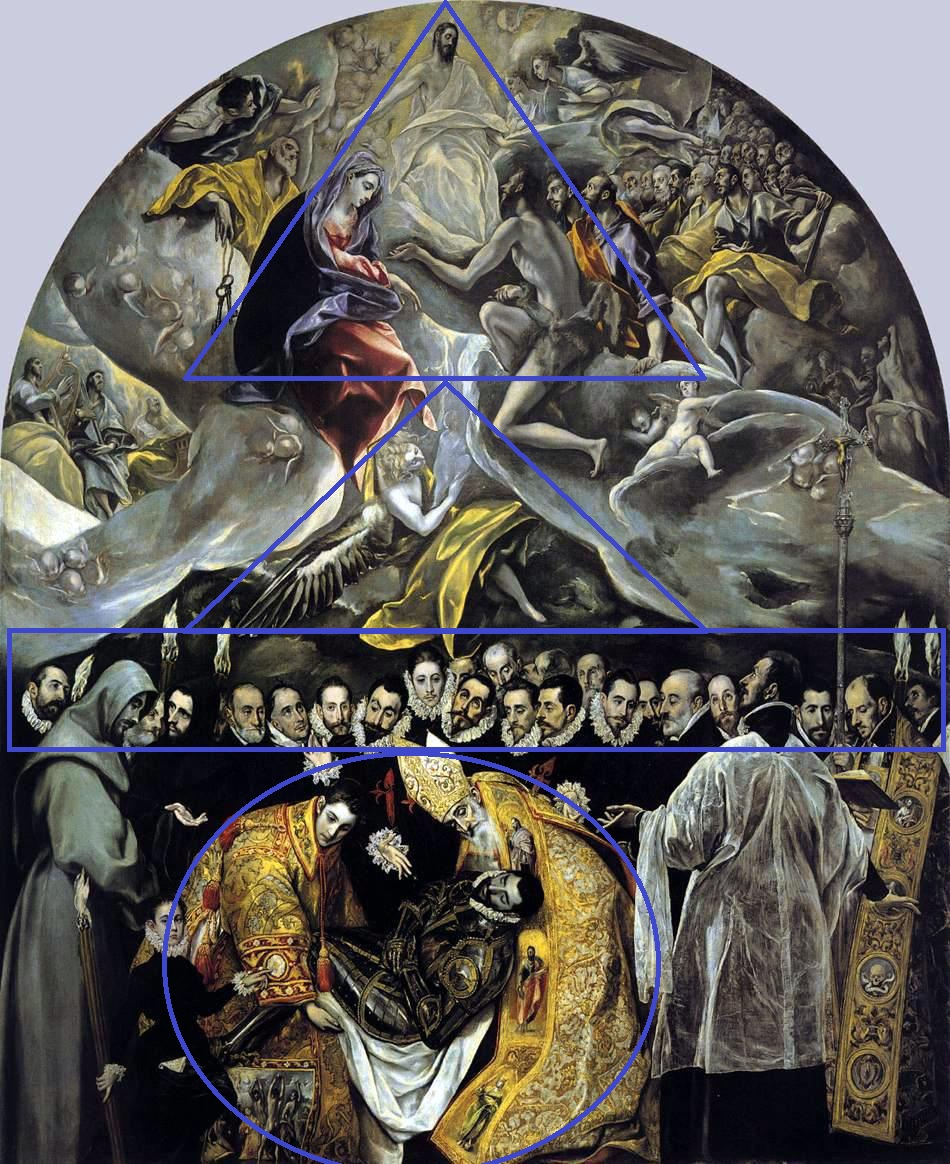
The Burial of Count Orgaz

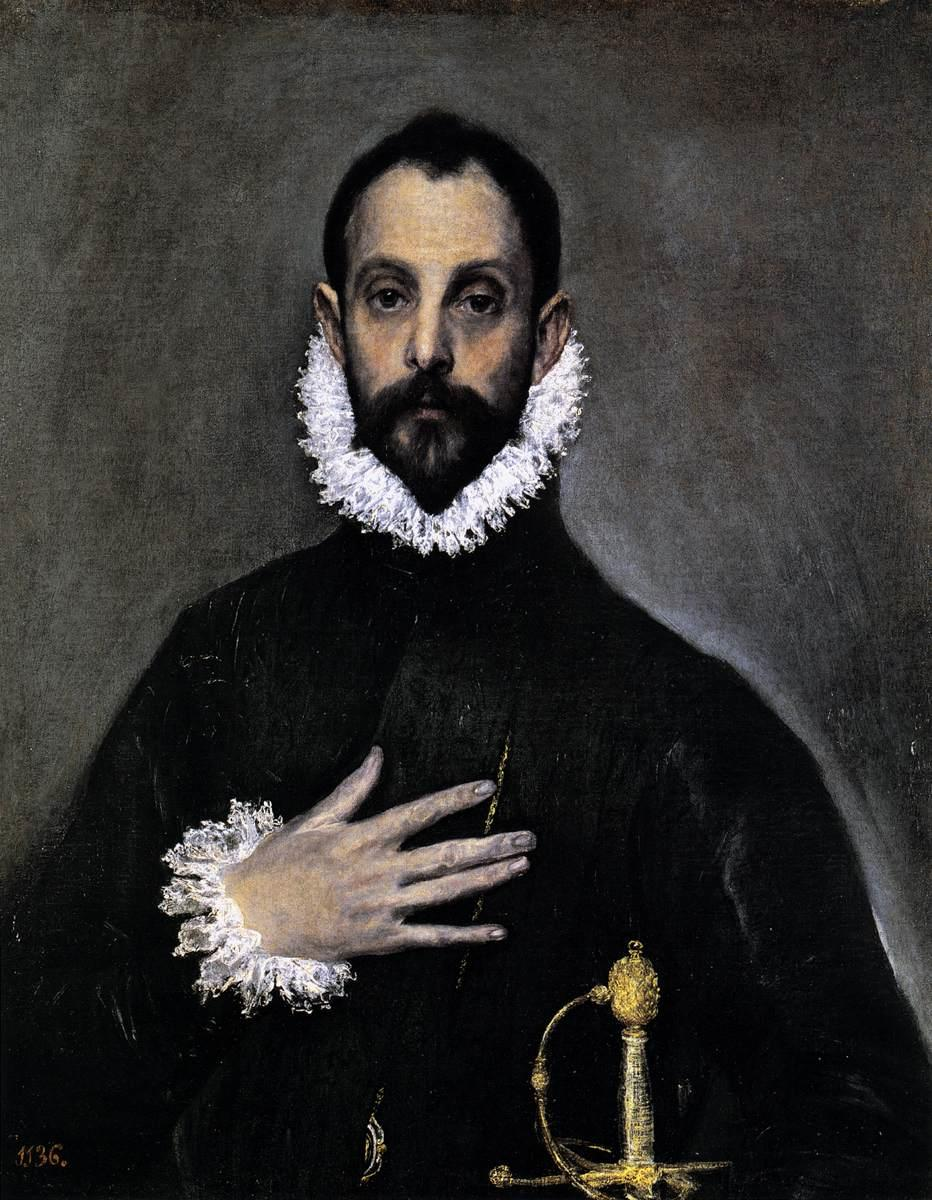
Nobelman

Laocoön

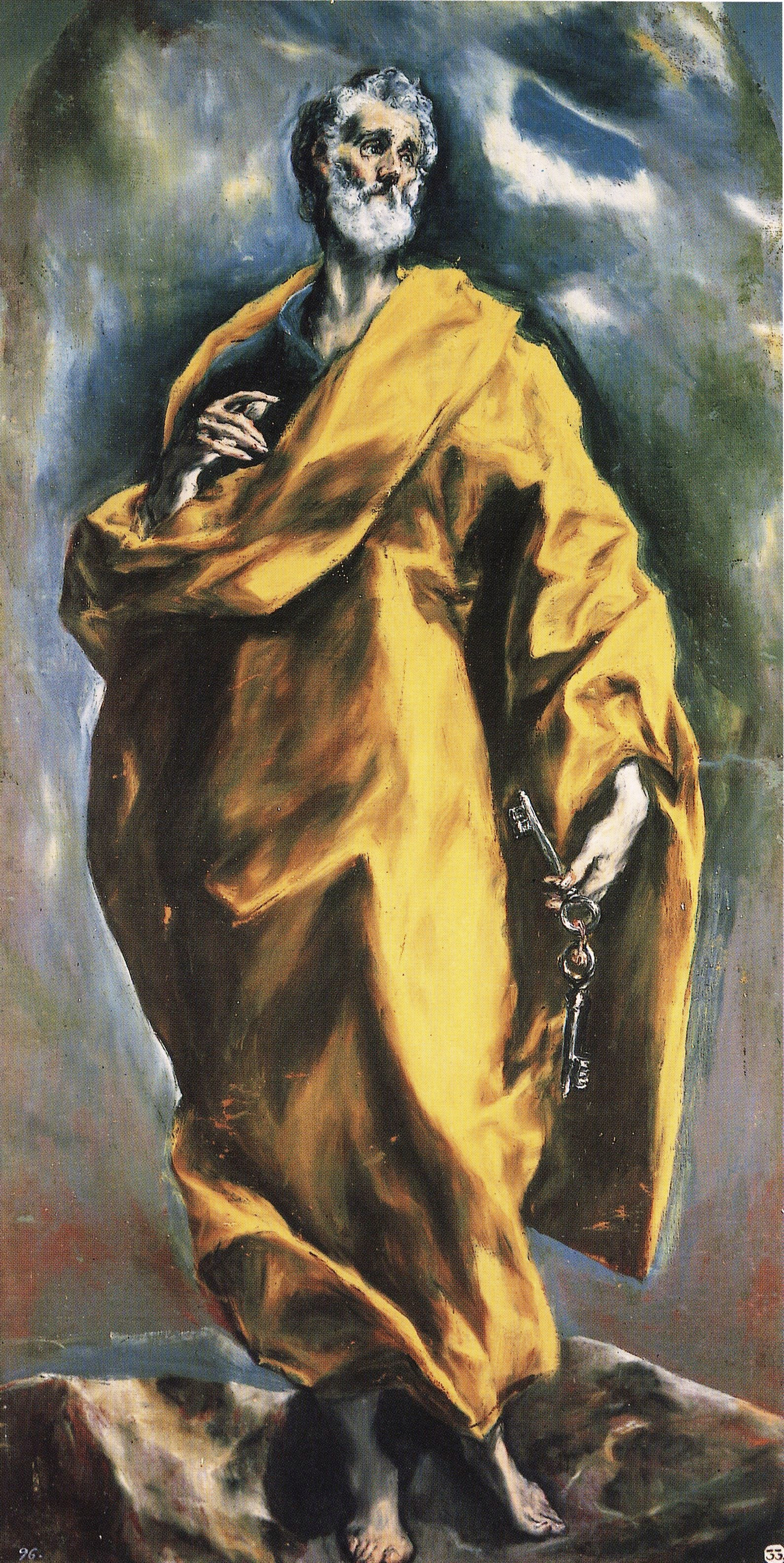
Saint Peter

El Greco also found the use of color to be of absolute importance. Establishing an aesthetic color palette was sometimes more important than the actual figure itself. Greco often had a tendency to use deep, full, rich colors to motivate the emotional expression in the piece to affect the viewers mood. The saturated hues of navy, black, purple, and red allowed for the viewer to be taken to another dimension. Greco's use of color captivates a sense of wrathfulness and divine devotion that seems other worldly.

The main idea of Greco's painting style was to dramatize the narration, emotion, and message of each piece. El Greco often used oil paints on canvas.

== Provenance ==
The painting, Christ Carrying the Cross, had been owned by Sir William Stirling Maxwell (1818–1878), General Archibald Stirling, and Lieutenant Colonel William Stirling. In 1953 it was acquired by Robert Lehman, and in 1975 it was acquired as part of his collection by the Metropolitan Museum of Art in New York.

It is on view in the Met museum's Gallery 958.

== The artwork ==
=== Details of the work ===
In Christ Carrying the Cross, there are a multitude of minute details that help narrate the raw, expressive emotion of the work. Overall, the aching look in Christ's eyes show both a plea for mercy and an understanding of what is to come. The painting itself was inspired by and parallels Michelangelo's Risen Christ. The work also relates directly to the Northern Italian narration of the way to calvary. This narration allows the artist to express the human emotions of Christ rather than his projected divine expression. In this work, the Northern Italian per narration allows Christ to beg for mercy while also having an understanding of his role in God's plan to forgive humankind for their sins. In addition to Christ's emotional expression, the Northern Italian narration of the crucifixion story allowed Christ to be an isolated being, separated from the whirlwind of the crowd surrounding his crucifixion.

On the way to calvary, Christ is carrying the cross to his own crucifixion in Jerusalem. This painting depicts a moment along the way where Christ stops amid a storm to communicate and reflect to the heavens before committing the ultimate sacrifice for humankind.

==== Christ ====
Many of the emotional details in this piece are shown in Christ himself. Below is a table elaborating on a few details from the painting that assist with the narration of the piece.

Details of Christ
Detail of the work:	Location of the detail:	Meaning of the detail:	Source:
Tears in Christ's gaze	Christ's eyes	The oversized tears in Christ's eyes demonstrate the moment where Christ is both pleading to the heavens and accepting his fate and sacrifice for humankind. Christ's tears are a direct expression to human emotion, relating to the tenderness and expressiveness of humankind, connecting both on a narrational and divine level.	Paragraph 4 https://www.elgreco.net/christ-carrying-the-cross.jsp
Crown of Thorns	On top of Christ's head	The crown of thorns was placed on Christ's head as a mockery from the guards. The guards were taunting Jesus, as he lay nailed to the cross, nagging him for being the King of the Jews. However, the crown no longer has a negative association. The crown now demonstrates that Christ died a king. In addition, the thorns and blood represent the outcast and torture of Christ leading up to his crucifixion.	
Implied line	Gaze to the heavens	An implied line is a suggested connection between two object on the same plane. In this case, Christ's line of sight is directed towards the heavens. Because of the strong cultural association with eye contact, it becomes the strongest form of an implied line. It allows the connection from an individual to pierce through to another object. In this work, by looking up, Christ is affirming and connecting to the God moments before his crucifixion.	https://artsandculture.google.com/usergallery/implied-lines/-QIS4P1SqwUOLQ

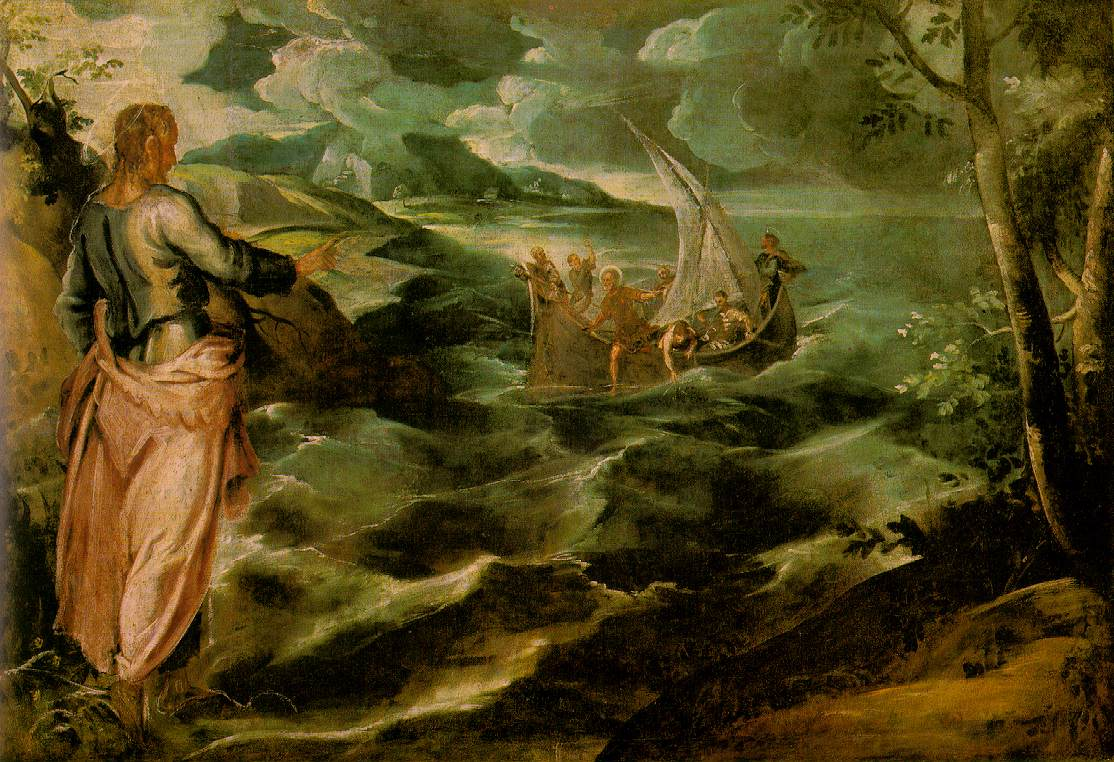
An alternate portrayal of Jesus calming the storm: Christ at the Sea of Galilee - Tintoretto

==== Background ====
The background of Christ Carrying the Cross is an overwhelming storm: lightning, thunder, and possible rain. The clouds gather in dark hues to darken the mood and narration of the piece. Usually, storms are associated with feelings of fear and unease: both feelings that are highly applicable to the human nature of this portrait. The storm clouds also have breaks of light, allowing the viewer to understand Christ's acceptance of his sacrifice as he communicates and reflects with the heavens.

Often, Christ imagery is associated with a biblical passage or text. In this case, the background illustrates Matthew 8:23-27. In this text, Christ reminds the disciples of their faith, even in moments of struggle and fear. This same narration is shown in Christ Carrying the Cross. Although the storm seems to be raging in the background in a moment of death, Christ reminds us that God is with us and is with him at all times. There is no need to have doubt or fear in the eyes of the Lord.

==== Christ and cross imagery ====
This painting is a prime example of religious imagery. Not only does the work feature Christ, a religious, iconoclastic figure, but it also displays an array of biblical passages and narratives throughout the work. As mentioned earlier, the background of the piece demonstrates Matthew 8:23-27. The actual narration of the crucifixion is written about in all four gospels of the Bible: Mark, Matthew, Luke, and John.

== See also ==
- List of works by El Greco
