= Christ Carrying the Cross =

Christ on the road to Golgotha, artistic theme

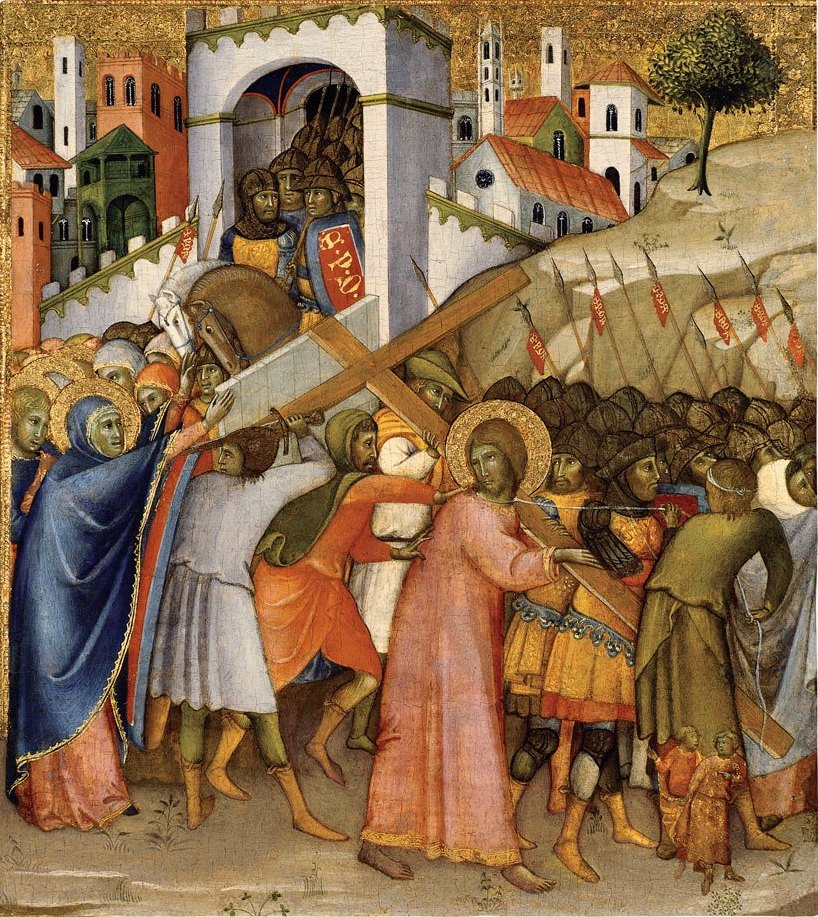
Andrea di Bartolo, Way to Calvary, c. 1400. The cluster of halos at the left are the Virgin Mary in front, with the Three Marys.

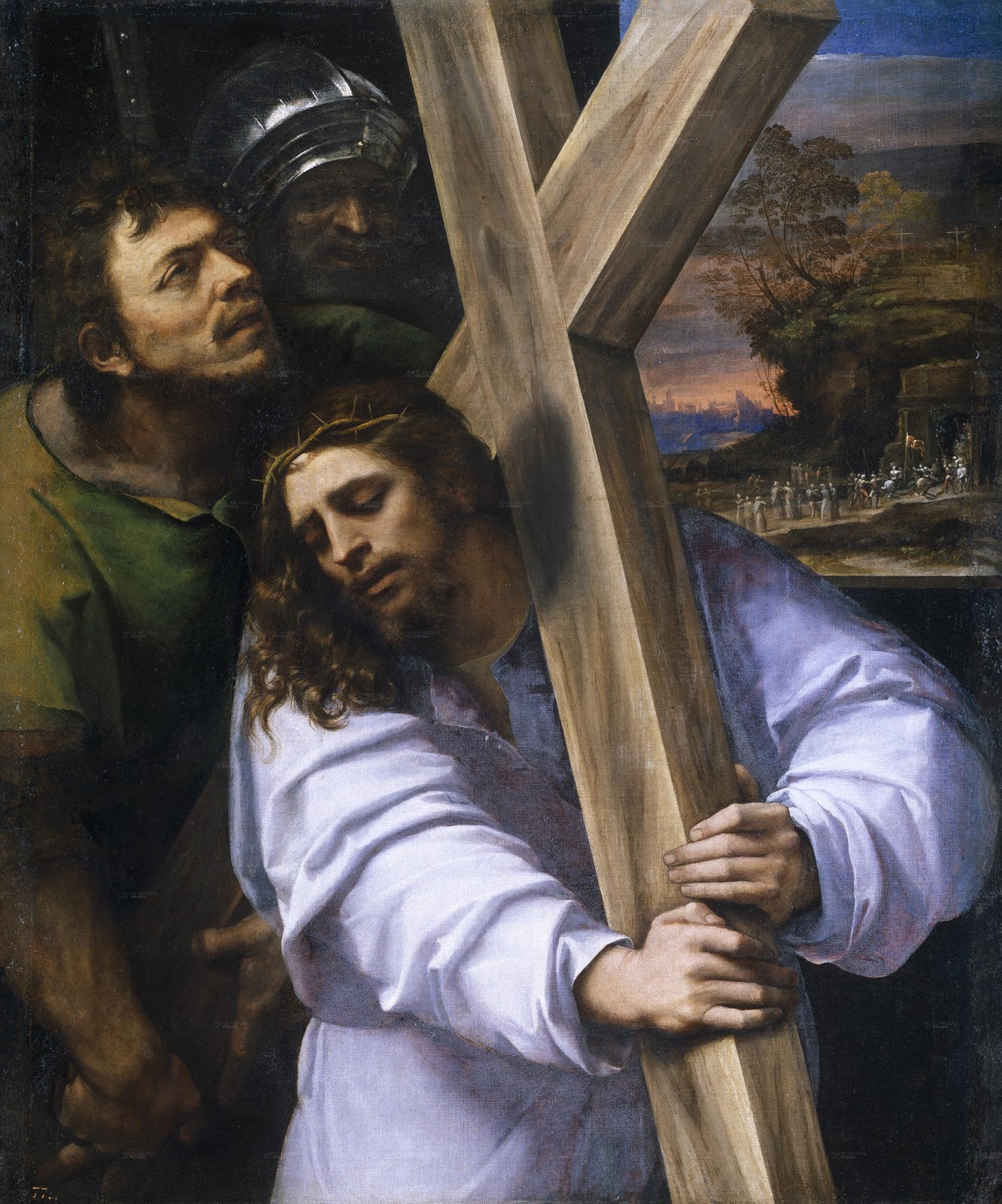
Sebastiano del Piombo, about 1513–14

Christ Carrying the Cross on his way to his crucifixion is an episode included in the Gospel of John, and a very common subject in art, especially in the fourteen Stations of the Cross, sets of which are now found in almost all Roman Catholic churches, as well as in many Lutheran churches and Anglican churches. However, the subject occurs in many other contexts, including single works and cycles of the Life of Christ or the Passion of Christ. Alternative names include the Procession to Calvary, Road to Calvary and Way to Calvary, Calvary or Golgotha being the site of the crucifixion outside Jerusalem. The actual route taken is defined by tradition as the Via Dolorosa in Jerusalem, although the specific path of this route has varied over the centuries and continues to be the subject of debate.

== Biblical references ==
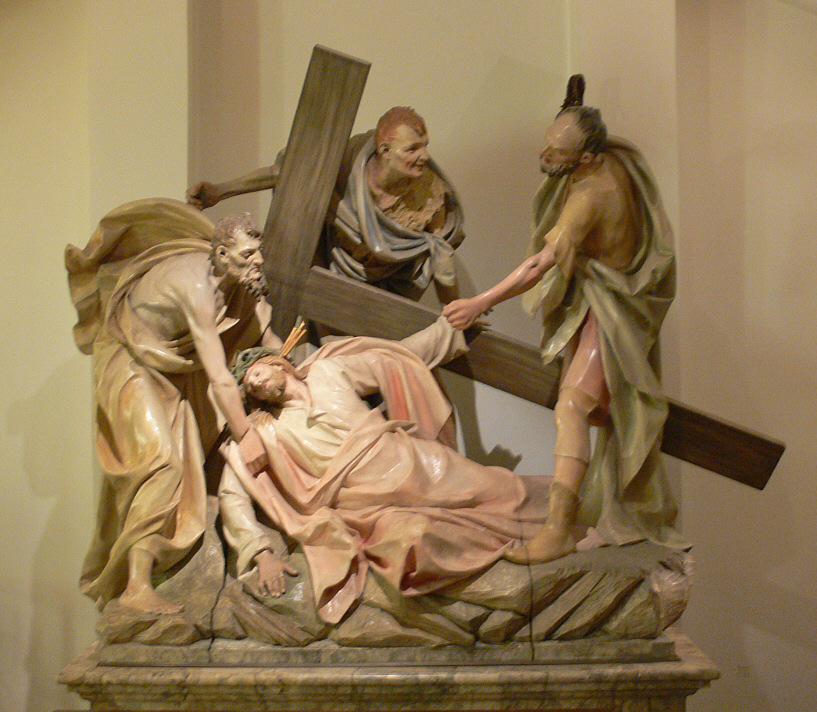
Jesus falls the second time from a 19th-century German Stations of the Cross

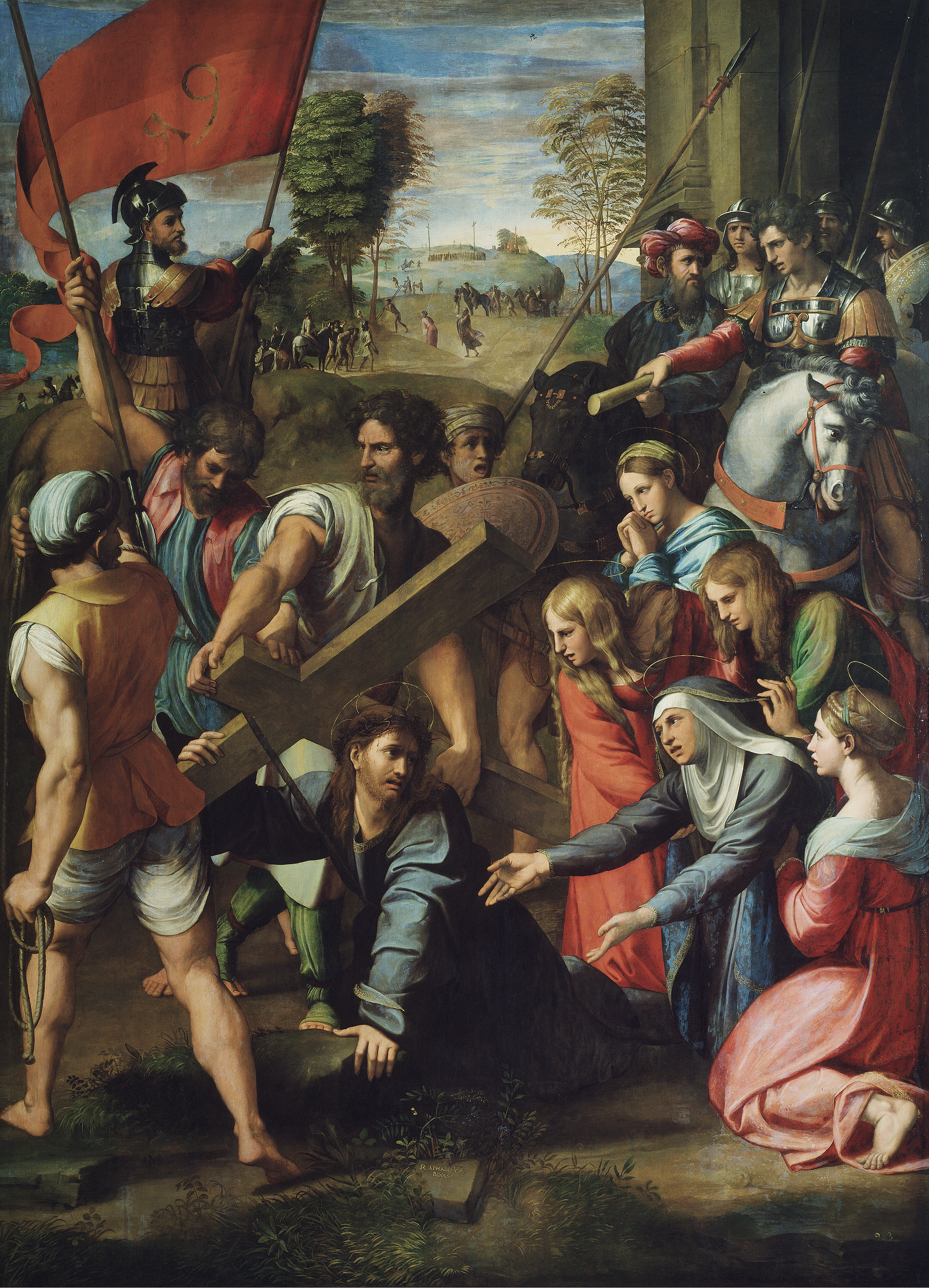
Christ Falling on the Way to Calvary, Raphael, 1516–1517

The carrying of the cross is mentioned, without much detail, in all the canonical Gospels: Matthew 27:31–33, Mark 15:20–22, Luke 23:26–32 and John 19:16–18. Only John specifically says Jesus carried his cross, and all but John include Simon of Cyrene, who was recruited by the soldiers from the crowd to carry or help carry the cross. Modern scholars, following descriptions of criminals carrying crossbars by Plautus and Plutarch, often take the Gospel description as meaning Jesus, then Simon, carried only a heavy patibulum, the crossbar, to a pole, stipes, which was permanently driven into the ground at Golgotha. However, in Christian imagery Jesus, and Simon, carry the complete cross—both patibulum and stipes.

Only Luke mentions the "women of Jerusalem", who were in later patristic writings and Christian art taken to include the Three Marys and the Virgin Mary. This meeting was usually located at the city gates, as in the painting illustrated, which is also typical in following Luke and showing Jesus turning his head to speak to them. The other episodes were later elaborations, with the Veil of Veronica appearing from the 13th century, and the falls of Christ, eventually three, first found in the Late Middle Ages. Luke mentions that the two thieves were also in the group walking out to Golgotha, but does not say that they had to carry their crosses, and though they may be identifiable among the walking figures, their crosses are very rarely anywhere to be seen in depictions of the group. Some works, like Raphael's Il Spasimo, Bruegel's Vienna Procession (see below for both), and the London Jacopo Bassano, have the thieves' two crosses already set up at the place of execution in the distant background.

Also of relevance is Matthew 16:24, with which St Francis of Assisi began his first Rule of 1221: "Then Jesus said to his disciples, “Whoever wants to be my disciple must deny themselves and take up their cross and follow me". St Francis also used to be led with a cord around his neck as a penitential exercise, the cord being a detail added to many depictions of the episode from two Old Testament passages. These are Isaiah 53:7: "He was oppressed and afflicted, yet he did not open his mouth; he was led like a lamb to the slaughter, and as a sheep before its shearers is silent, so he did not open his mouth" and Jeremiah 11:19 "I had been like a gentle lamb led to the slaughter...", both of which were very frequently cited by medieval commentaries. In medieval typology, Isaac carrying wood up the mountain for his sacrifice is the most common parallel for the episode, and often shown as a complementary scene; this scene is "Isaac Bearing the Faggots" (or "wood") in traditional art history terminology.

== In popular devotions ==
The fully elaborated traditional account of the episode is demonstrated in the Stations of the Cross, where it is divided into a number of incidents, which between them account for most sculptural depictions:

1. Pilate sentences Christ
2. Jesus is given His cross
3. Jesus falls the first time
4. Jesus meets His Mother
5. Simon of Cyrene carries the cross
6. Veronica wipes the face of Jesus
7. Jesus falls the second time
8. Jesus meets the daughters of Jerusalem
9. Jesus falls the third time

Ten through fourteen cover the rest of the Passion.

It is also one of the Sorrowful Mysteries of the Rosary, and the meeting with Mary the fourth of the Seven Sorrows of the Virgin. The procession is still re-enacted in a number of annual Good Friday processions in Catholic countries, some of which include actors playing the leading persons and a cross. On the Via Dolorosa such events occur all year round.

== History of the depiction ==
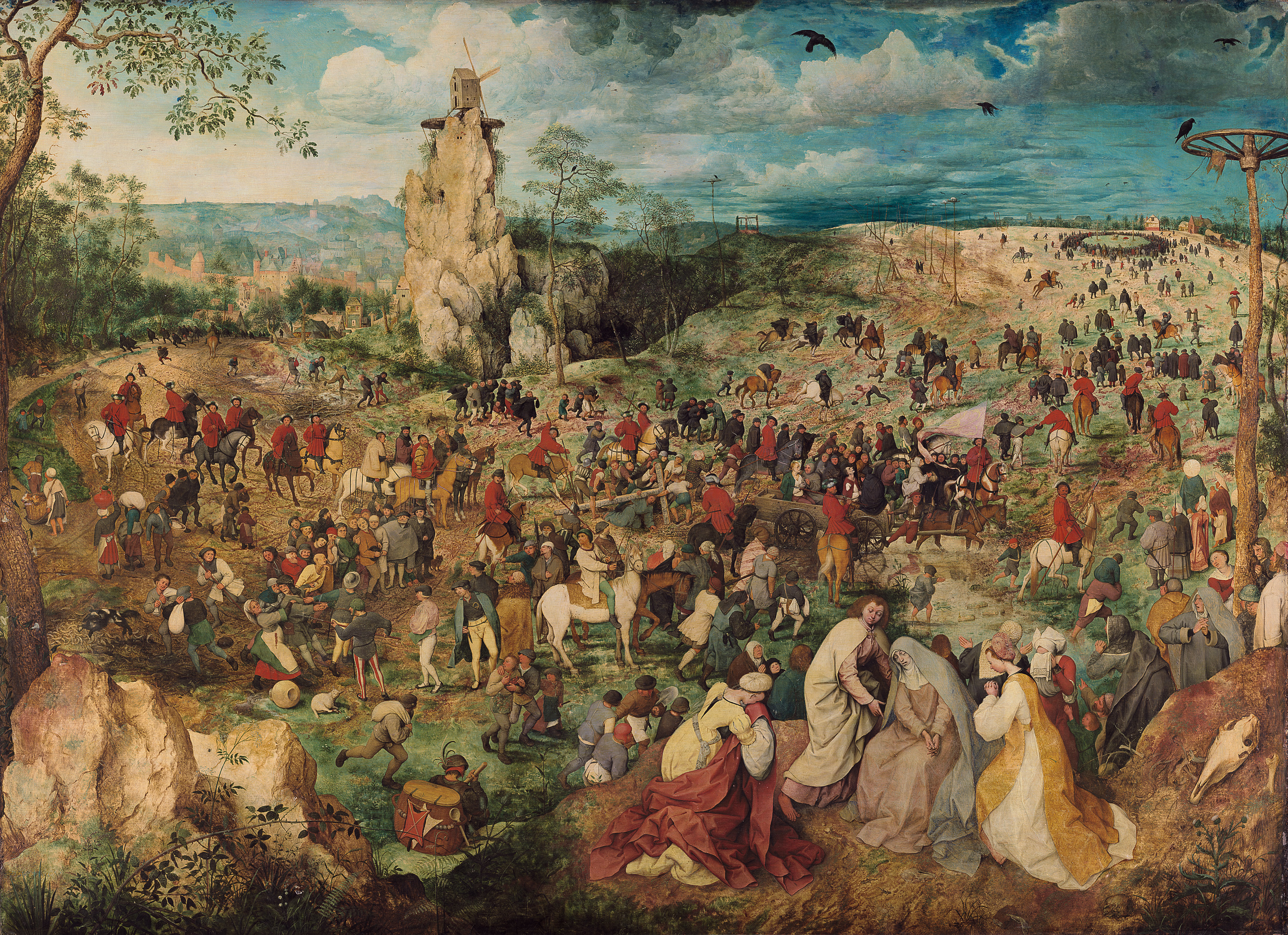
Procession to Calvary, Pieter Bruegel the Elder, 1564

Until around 1100, Simon of Cyrene was more often shown actually carrying the cross than Jesus, and from this time the number of other figures typically included in the scene increases. In Byzantine depictions, Jesus typically walks with his hands bound, and a soldier leading him holding the rope, as Simon carries the cross. In some early depictions, Jesus and Simon carry the cross together. In the later Middle Ages, probably influenced by Passion plays, a large crowd of figures may surround Jesus, displaying a great variety of feelings, from contempt to grief. This development culminates in the large landscape of Pieter Bruegel the Elder's Procession to Calvary (1564, now Vienna). Although in early and Eastern depictions the cross is not always represented as a heavy burden, and may be held free of the ground by either Simon or Jesus, by the later Middle Ages the cross is always clearly difficult to carry, and the base is dragged along the ground, in line with the increased emphasis in the period of emphasizing the sufferings of the Passion. From this period Jesus usually wears his Crown of Thorns, which he did not earlier.

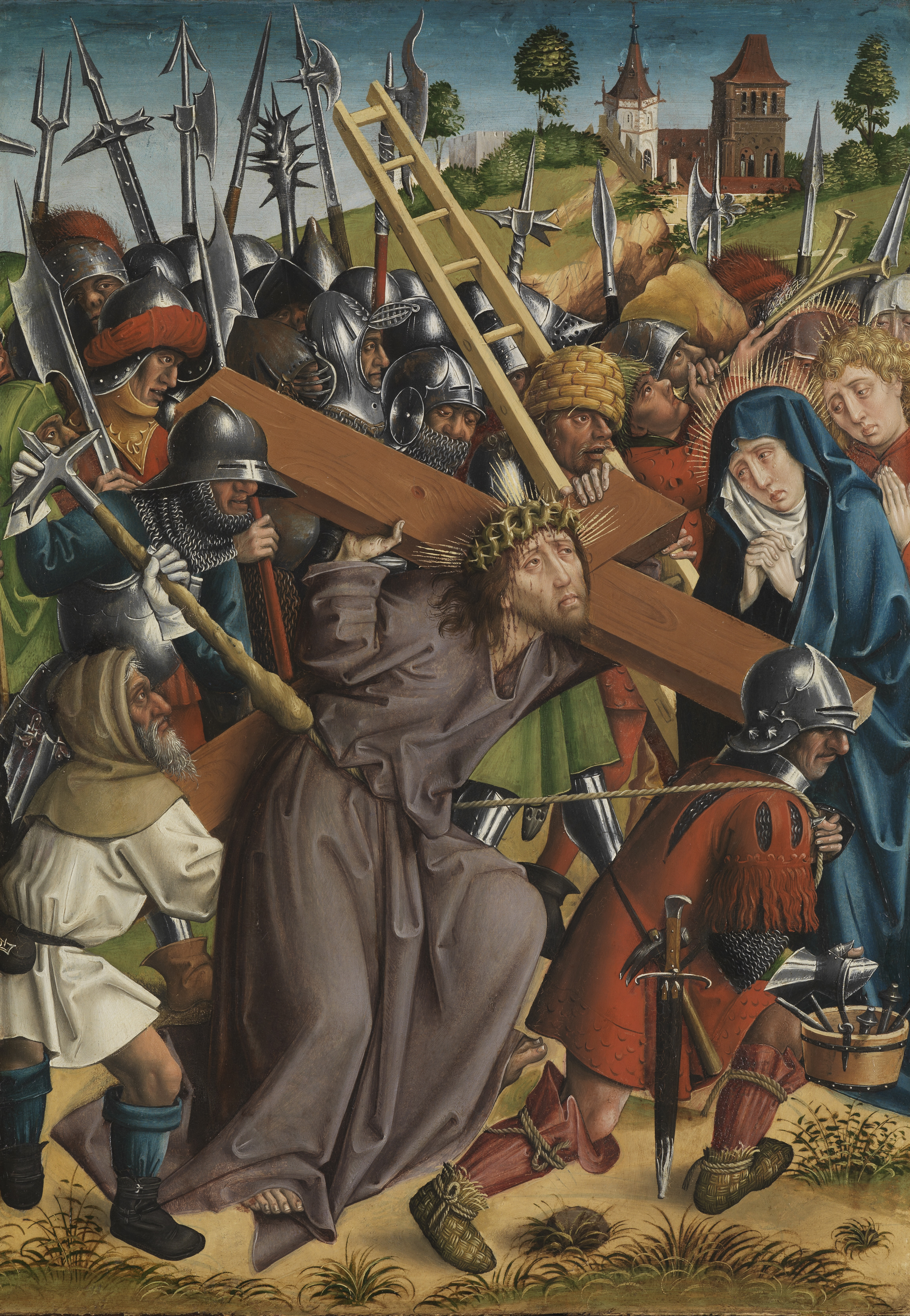
Master of the Karlsruhe Passion, c. 1450-55

An early example of a type of devotional image showing Jesus alone is a small panel by Barna da Siena of 1330–1350 in the Frick Collection. These continued through the Renaissance and Baroque period, with a "close-up" half length composition first appearing in Northern Italy around 1490.

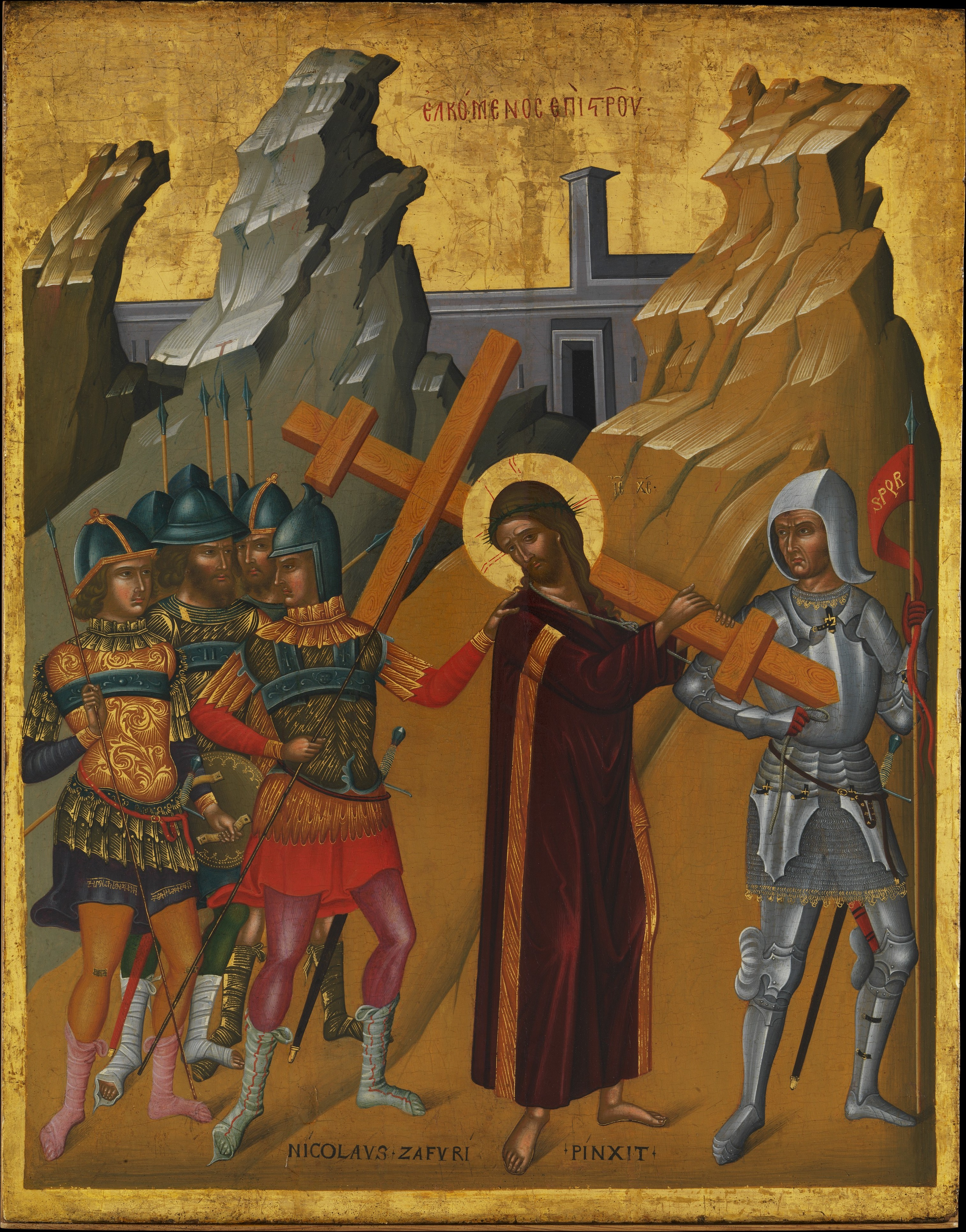
Cretan School depiction of Christ Bearing the Cross painted around 1500

Somewhat in contrast to most andachtsbilder, the suffering of Christ is often less graphically depicted in these than in larger scenes where he is mobbed by a hostile crowd. As triptychs became popular, the scene often occurs as the left-hand wing to a central Crucifixion, with an Entombment or Resurrection on the right-hand wing. A notable version of Christ Bearing the Cross was completed by Cretan painter Nikolaos Tzafouris around 1500 painted on a single wood panel. Christ is depicted with soldiers as he gazes upon his viewers with sorrow.

From around 1500, the subject became used for single piece altarpieces in Italy, usually showing either the meeting with Veronica or the Swoon of the Virgin or spasimo, when the Virgin swoons, faints, or at least falls to her knees, both fairly recent and rather controversial introductions, without scriptural authority.

== Works ==
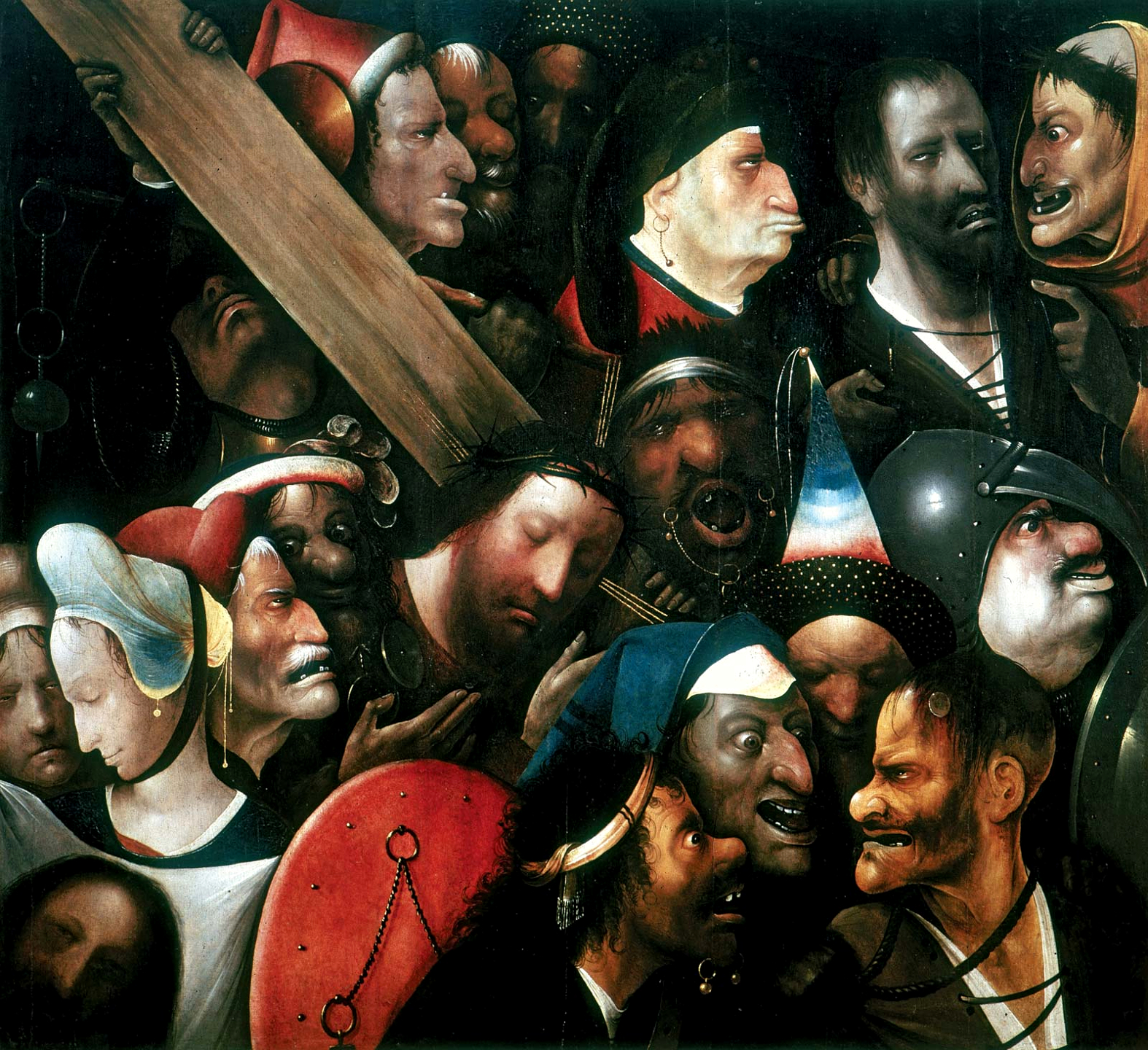
Christ Carrying the Cross (Bosch, Ghent)

Individual works with articles include the following (apart from a large number of cycles featuring the scene):

- Christ Falling on the Way to Calvary (Raphael), or Lo Spasimo
- Christ Carrying the Cross (Titian)
- Cristo della Minerva, sculpture by Michelangelo
- Christ Carrying the Cross (Bosch, Ghent)
- Christ Carrying the Cross (Bosch, Madrid)
- Christ Carrying the Cross (Bosch, Vienna)
- Christ Carrying the Cross (El Greco, Barcelona)
- Christ Carrying the Cross (El Greco, Madrid)
- Christ Carrying the Cross (El Greco, New York)
- Procession to Calvary, painting by Pieter Bruegel the Elder

== Gallery ==
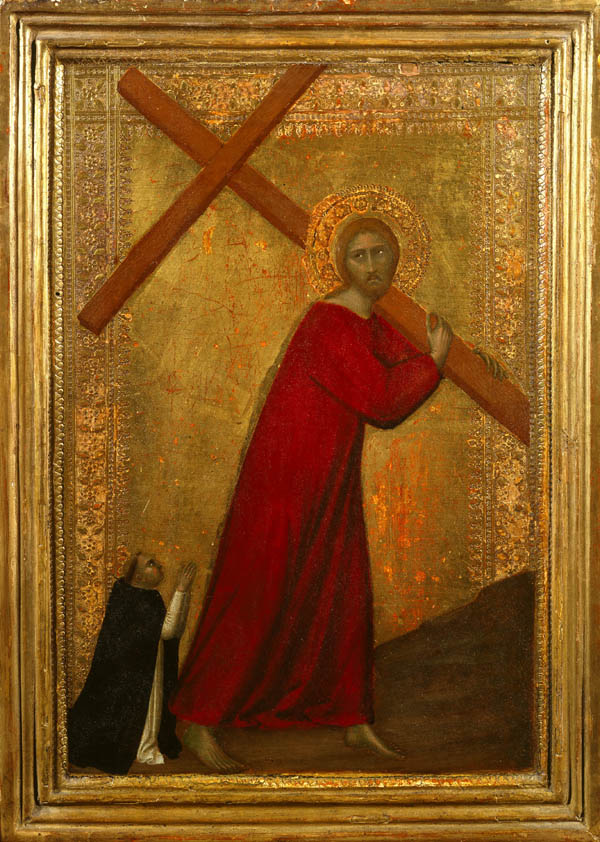
Christ, with a donor portrait of a Dominican friar, Barna da Siena, 1330–1350

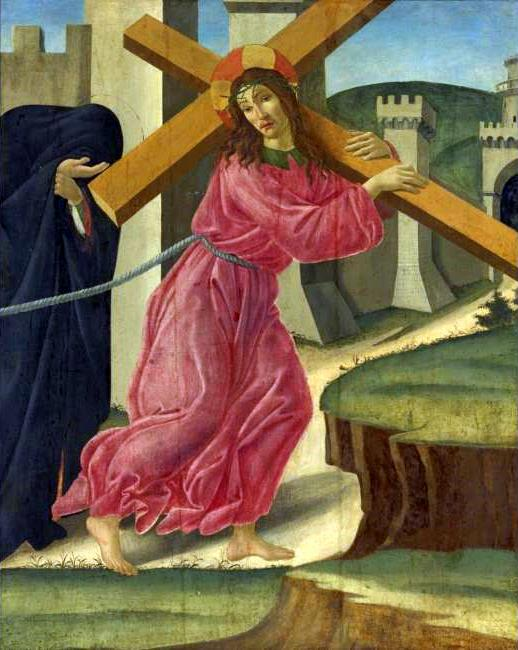
Sandro Botticelli, 1490–91

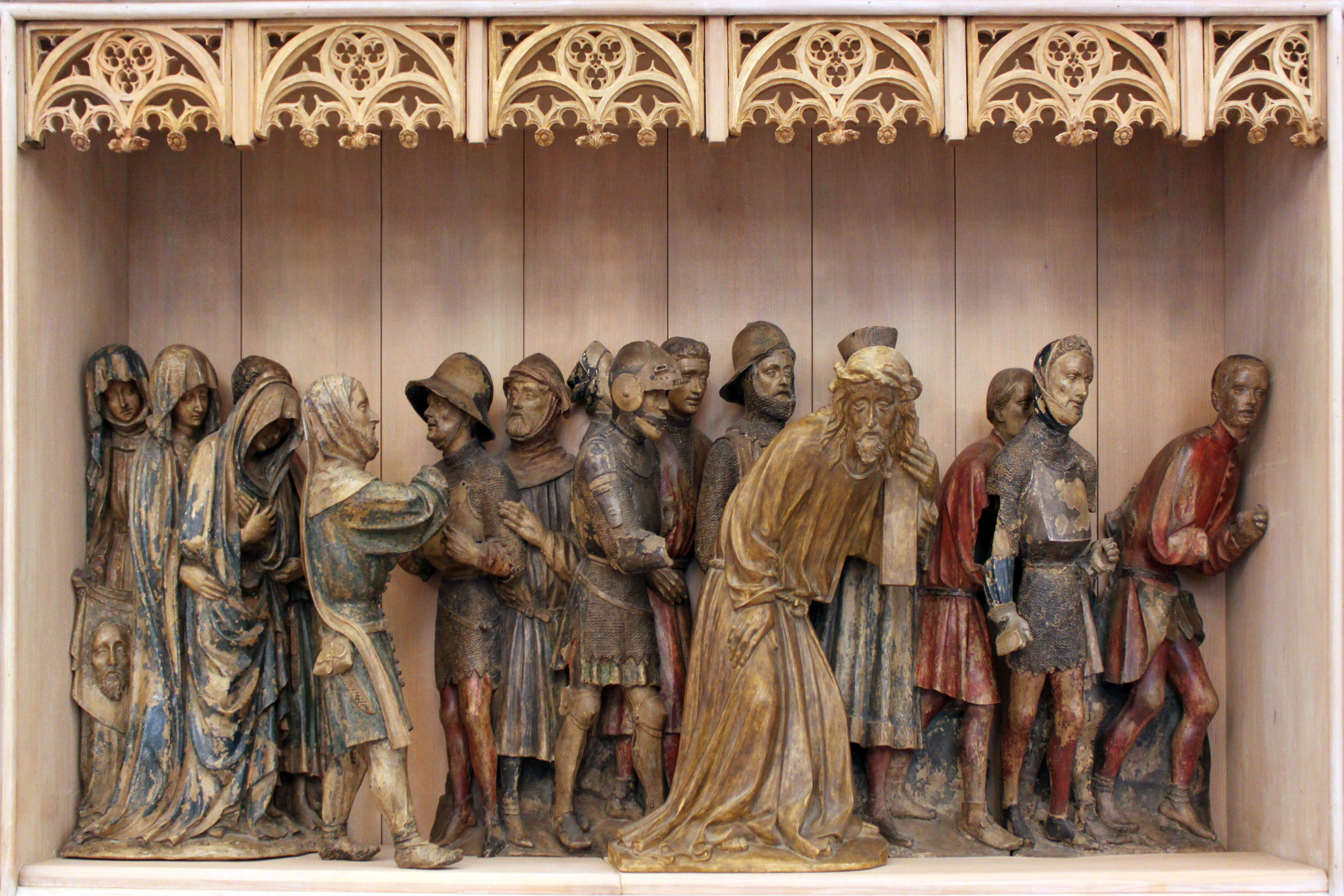
Jesus Christ bearing the Cross, Lorch in the Rhine Valley, ca. 1425, Bodemuseum Berlin

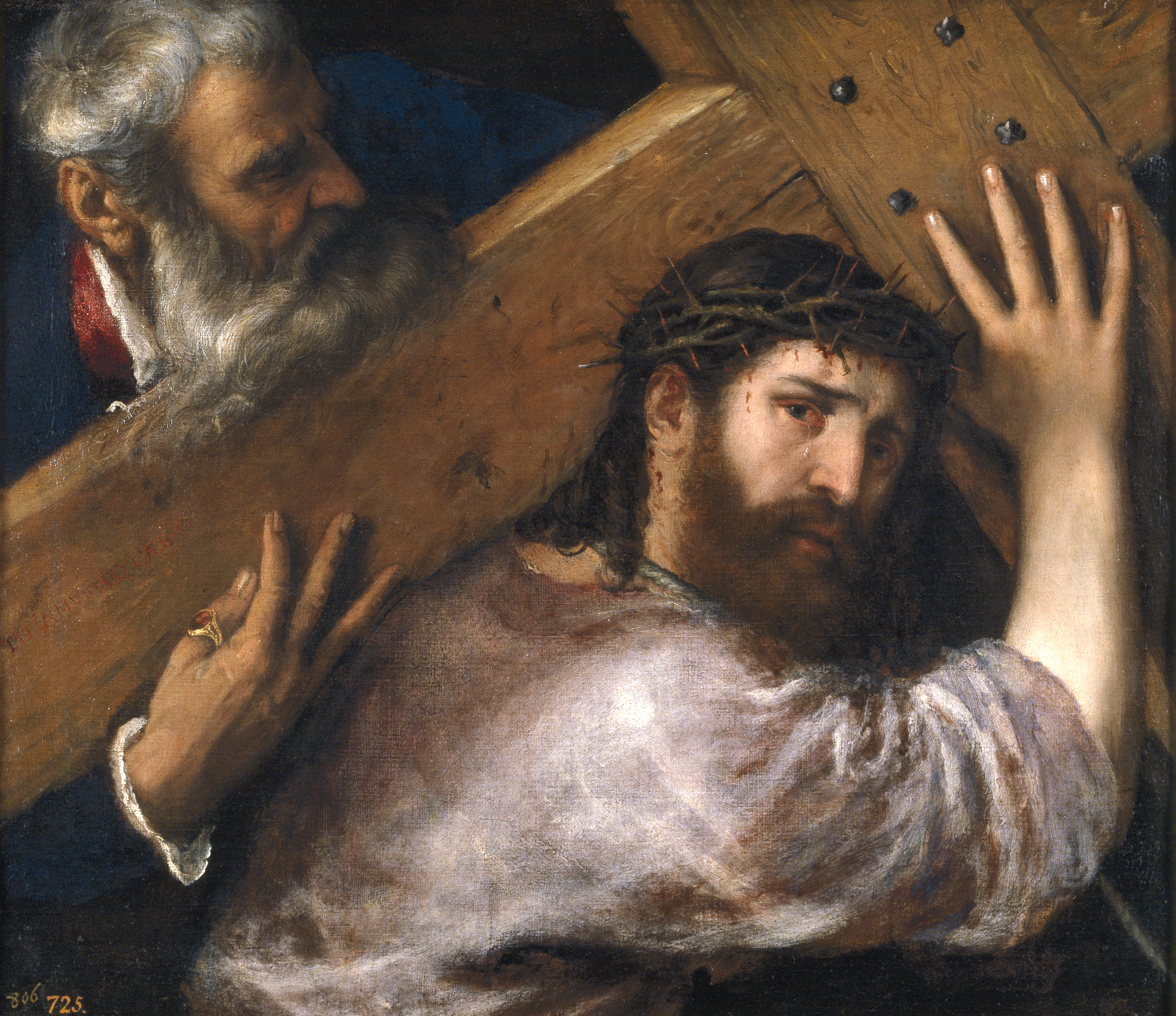
Titian, c. 1565

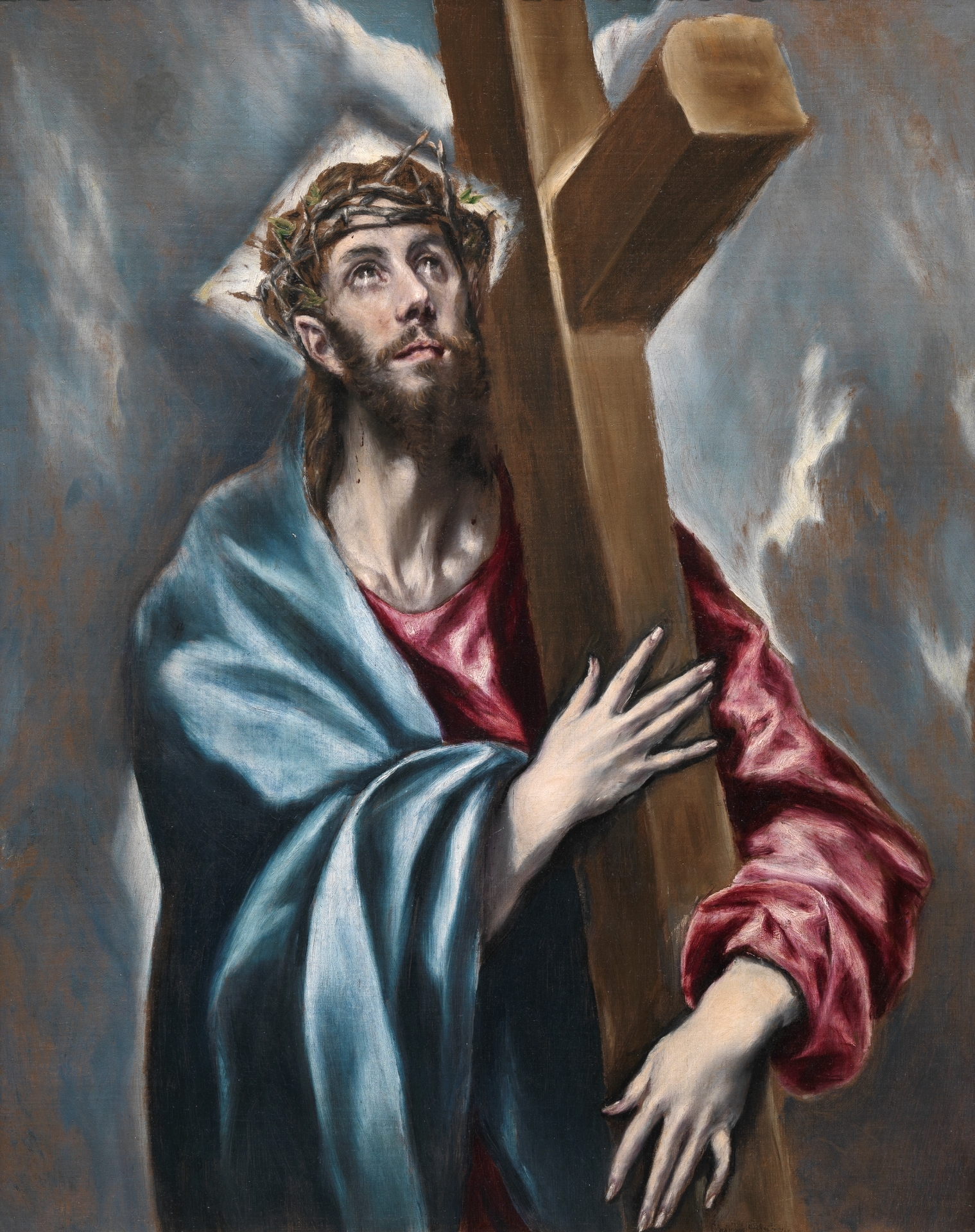
El Greco, c. 1602
