= Donne Triptych =

Triptych by Hans Memling

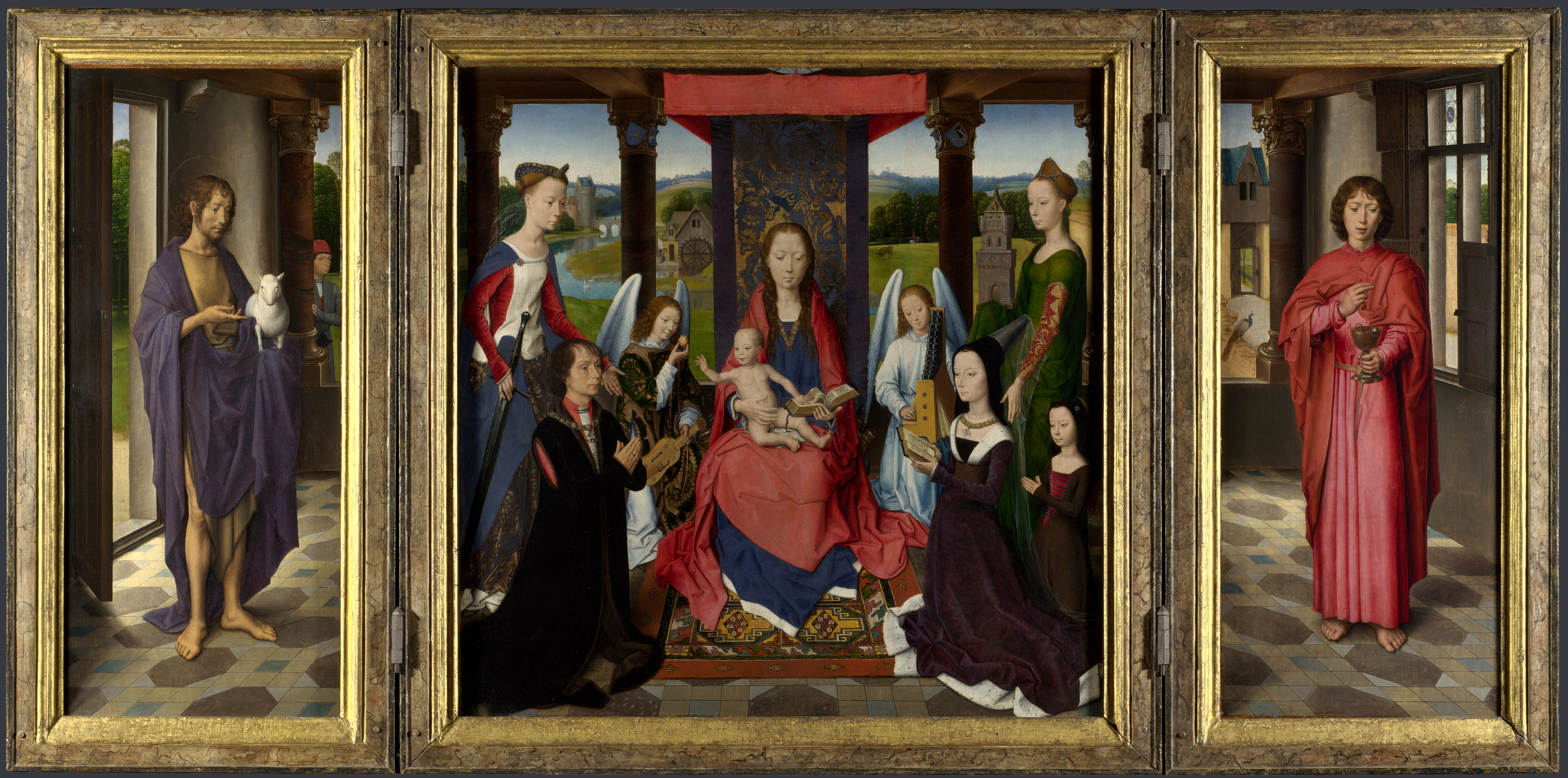
The Donne Triptych by Hans Memling, c. 1470-80s, National Gallery, London.

The Donne Triptych (or Donne Altarpiece) is a hinged-triptych altarpiece by the Early Netherlandish painter Hans Memling. The painting was created around 1478 for the soldier, courtier and diplomat Sir John Donne. The triptych comprises three panels that include five individual paintings. The central interior panel depicts the Virgin and Child, donor portraits of Sir John Donne, the patron, along with his wife and daughter, as well as Saint Catherine of Alexandria and Saint Barbara, the two double-sided wings include images of Saint John the Baptist, Saint John the Evangelist on the interior sides of the wings, and Saint Christopher and Saint Anthony Abbot on the two exteriors of the wings.

Art historians have debated whether the altarpiece was painted in the early 1480s, around the same time Memling painted the Virgin and Child with Saints Catherine of Alexandria and Barbara, in New York at the Metropolitan Museum of Art. An earlier date of sometime in the late 1470s is possible, at the time he completed the similar St John Altarpiece, or it may have been painted as a precursor to that altarpiece.

The donor, Sir John Donne of Kidwelly, was a Picardy-born Welsh diplomat for the House of York who visited Bruges at least once, in 1468 to attend Charles the Bold and Margaret of York's wedding; how he became acquainted with Memling is as uncertain as when he commissioned the triptych.

The triptych is in the collection of the National Gallery, London.

== Patron and commission ==
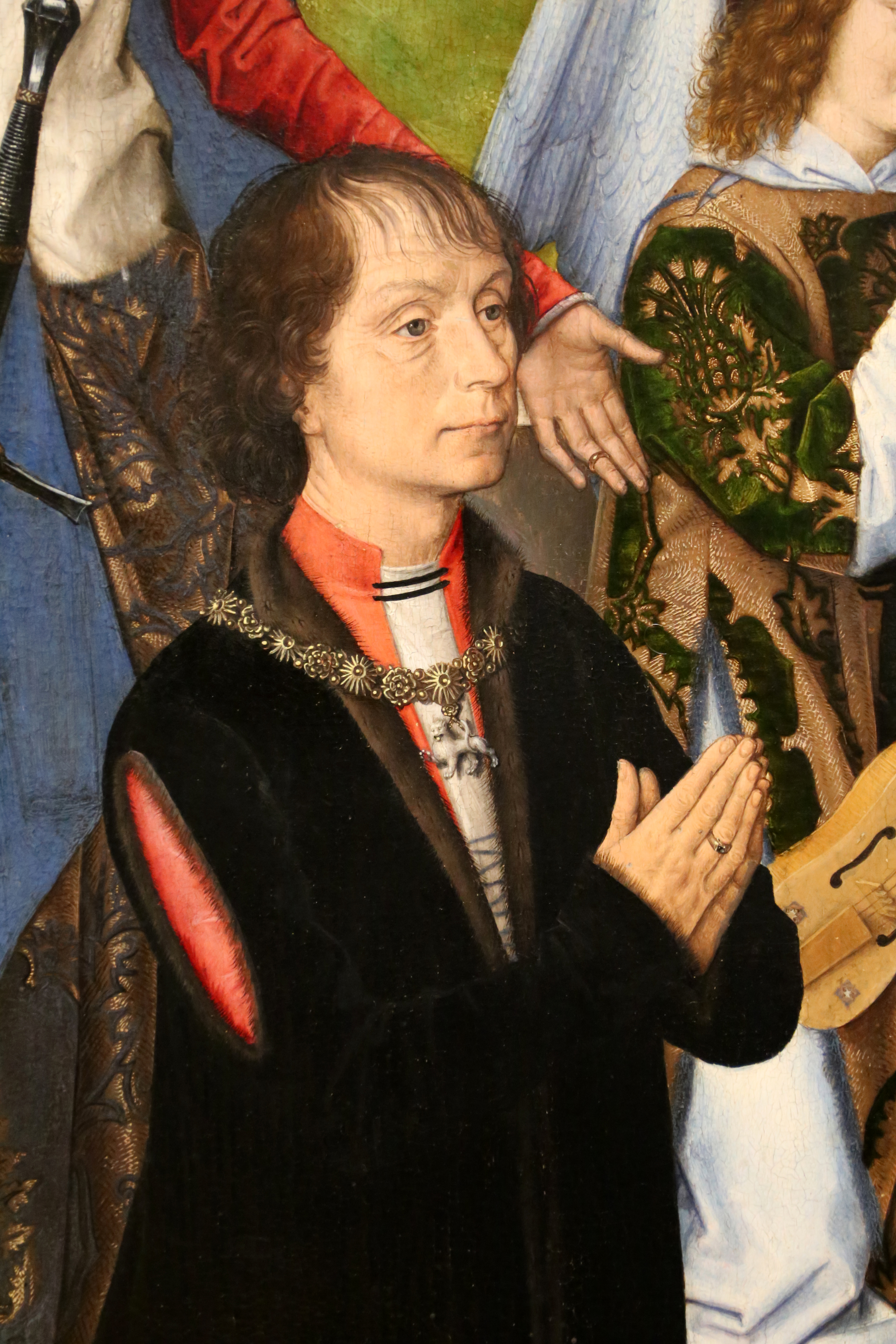
Donor portrait of Sir John Donne, patron of the Donne Triptych

Sir John Donne, of Kidwelly, Carmarthenshire, a courtier to the English King Edward IV (r. 1461–1470 and 1471–1483) and a loyal supporter of the House of York, perhaps commissioned the painting on a visit to Bruges in 1479 after seeing Hans Memling's St. John Altarpiece that had been created in the mid-1470s for Old St. John's Hospital (Sint-Janshospitaal). Scholars have proposed that it is likely that the St. John Altarpiece was taken into consideration in the contract between Donne and Memling, as the composition, architectural setting, figural placement a virtually the same. Memling was known to re-use, recycle, and recombine workshop patterns in order to run an efficient workshop. The Donne Triptych is crafted with oil paint on wood and is also framed in oak wood.

=== Donne Coat of arms ===
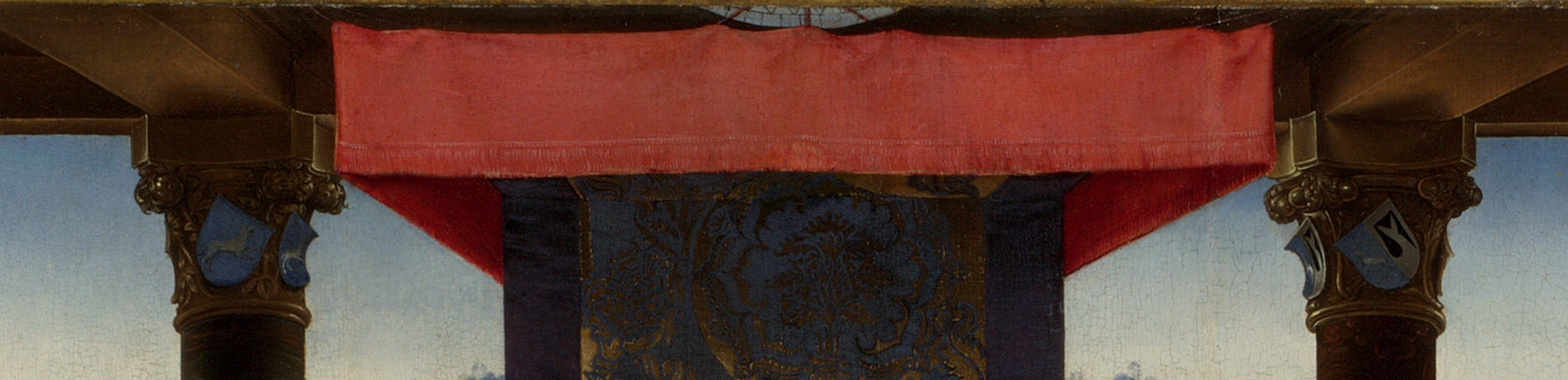
Sir John Donne's coat of arms hanging from the column capitals in the Donne Triptych

Campbell has identified Donne's coat of arms as "Azure, a wolf salient argent" and they can clearly be seen attached to the two column capitals that flank the canopied throne of the Virgin Mary in the central panel of the triptych. The armorial escutcheons are also found in the stained glass seen in the right wing with the figure of Saint John the Evangelist. Similarly, an image of the Donne coat of arms, along with a donor portrait of Sir John Donne, can be seen in the Louthe Hours (also known as the Donne Hours), painted by Simon Marmion c.1480.

=== Donne Livery Collars ===
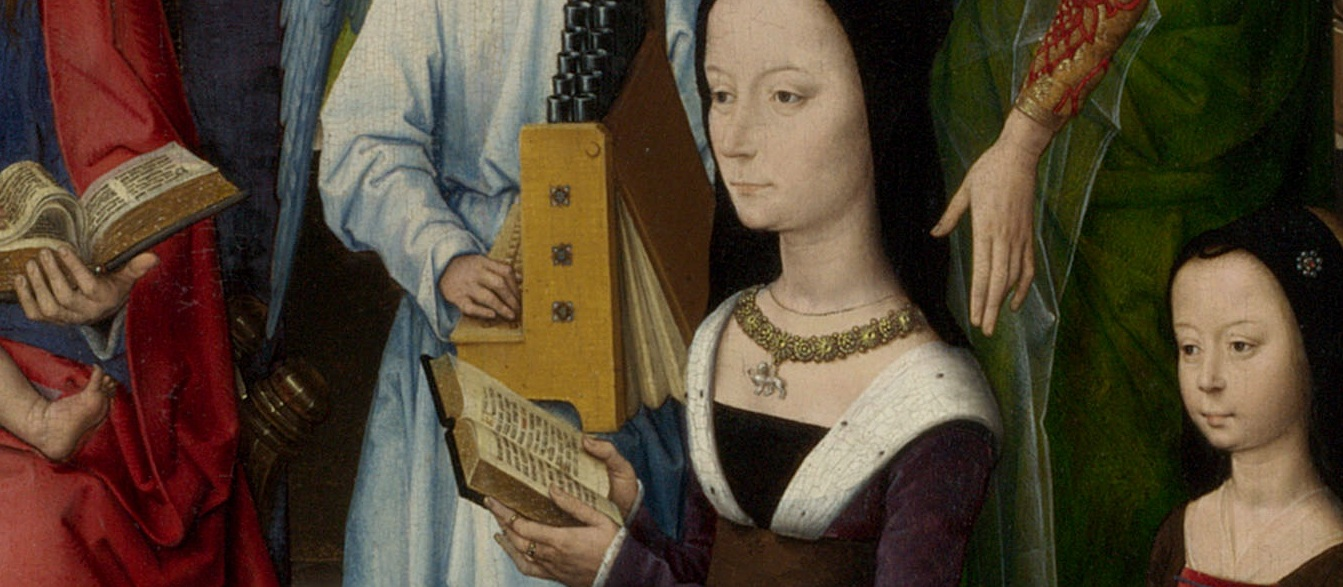
Yorkist Collar on Lady Donne

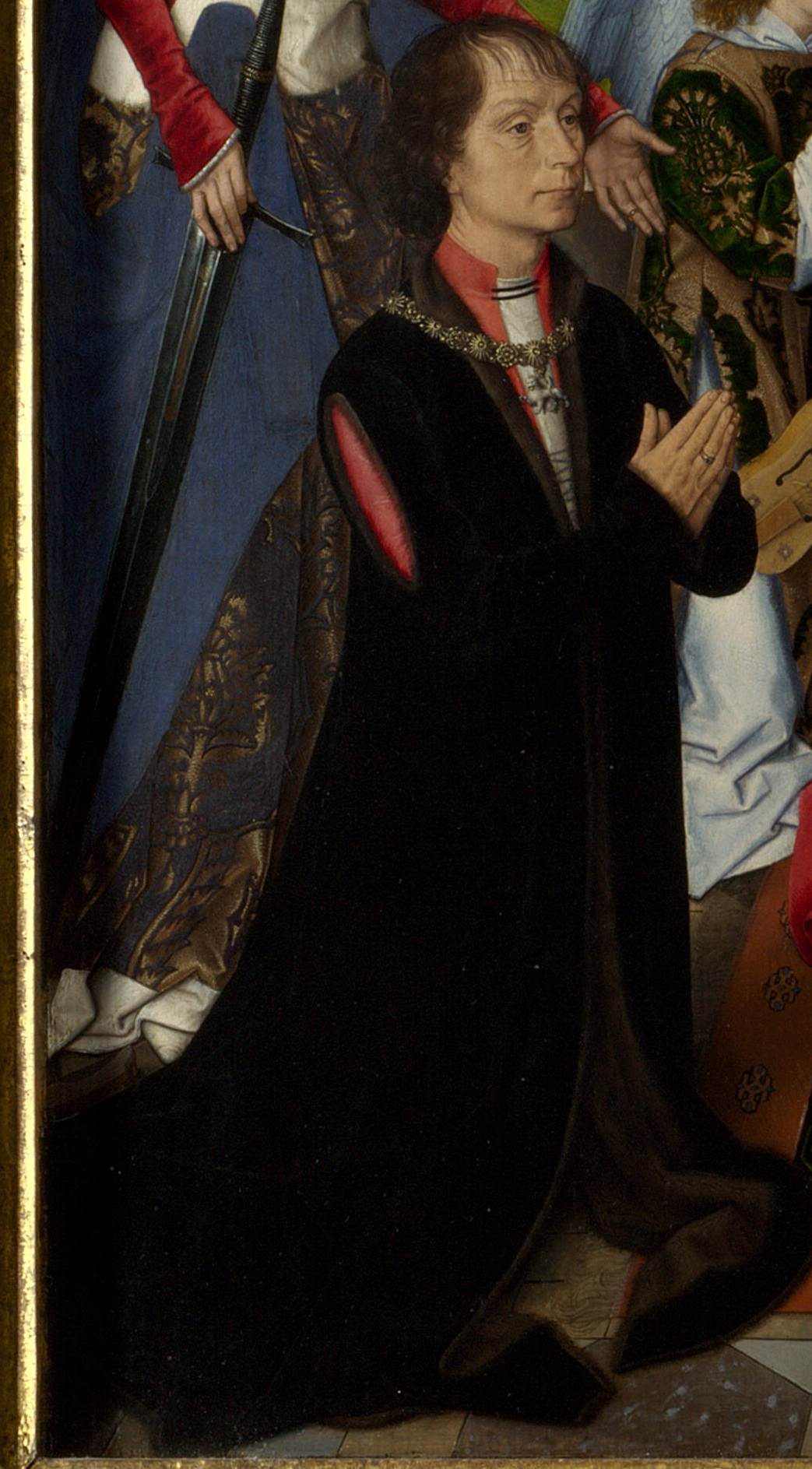
Yorkist Collar on Sir John Donne

A livery collar represents a royal symbol presented to people who served in the royal household, sheriffs and those who expressed loyalty during the battlefield. There were two different types of livery collars in England during the fifteenth century: the Lancastrian and the Yorkist collar. In the painting, both Sir John Donne and his wife Elizabeth are donned with Yorkist collars. Their collars include the roses and suns of the House of York, as well as white the lion which hangs suspended at the center, to demonstrate their political fidelity to the House of York.

== Description of the exterior panels ==
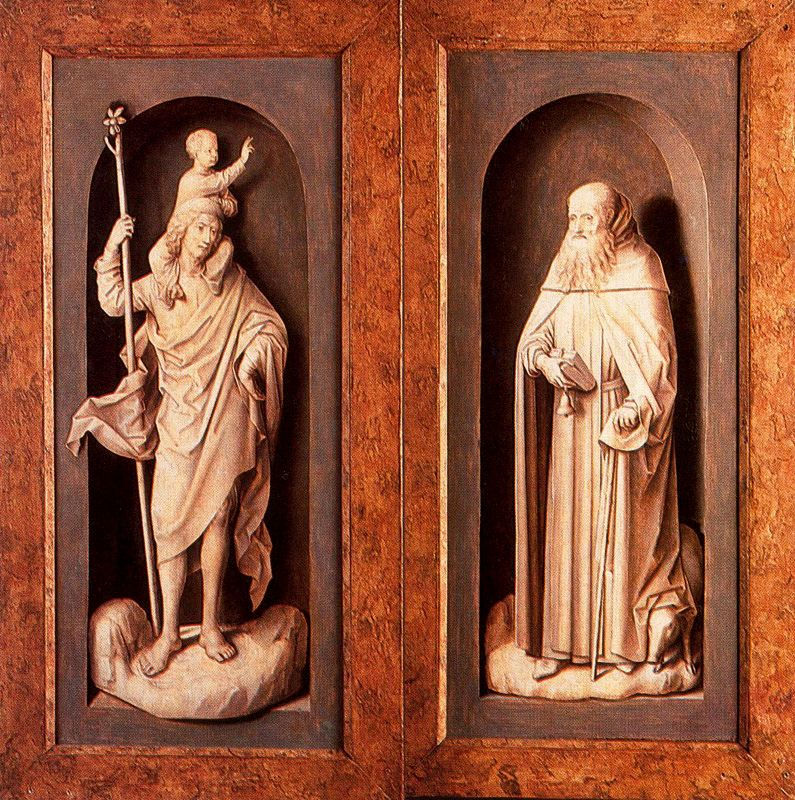
Exterior panels of the Donne Triptych depicting Saint Christopher and Saint Anthony Abbot

The exterior panels are only seen when the triptych is closed, and two saints anchor the wings: Saint Christopher and Saint Anthony Abbot, both executed in the grisaille technique, imitating marble or stone statues in niches. Both saints are shown with light shining on them, casting shadows behind them.

While it remains unknown as to why these two Saints were included in the triptych, the patron, Sire John Donne, likely had a particular devotional interest in them. Saint Christopher and Saint Anthony Abbot are often associated with protection and healing.

In the left niche of the triptych, Saint Christopher holds a flowering staff, and carries the Christ-Child on his shoulders, who raises his hand in a blessing gesture toward Saint Anthony. In the niche on the right, Saint Anthony holds a book and a bell in his right hand, a staff in his left, and a pig at his side.

== Description of the interior panels ==
=== Central panel ===
Sir John Donne is honored by the inclusion of two saints, Saint John the Baptist and Saint John the Evangelist, who share his name with him.

=== Left panel ===
On the left side of the painting, Saint John the Baptist holds a lamb, representing the Lamb of God. Saint John the Baptist is the patron saint of baptism, monastics, and converts, among many other things. There is a man with a red hat behind him who is looking at the family and the Virgin and the Child. Some have argued that the man is the artist's self-portrait.

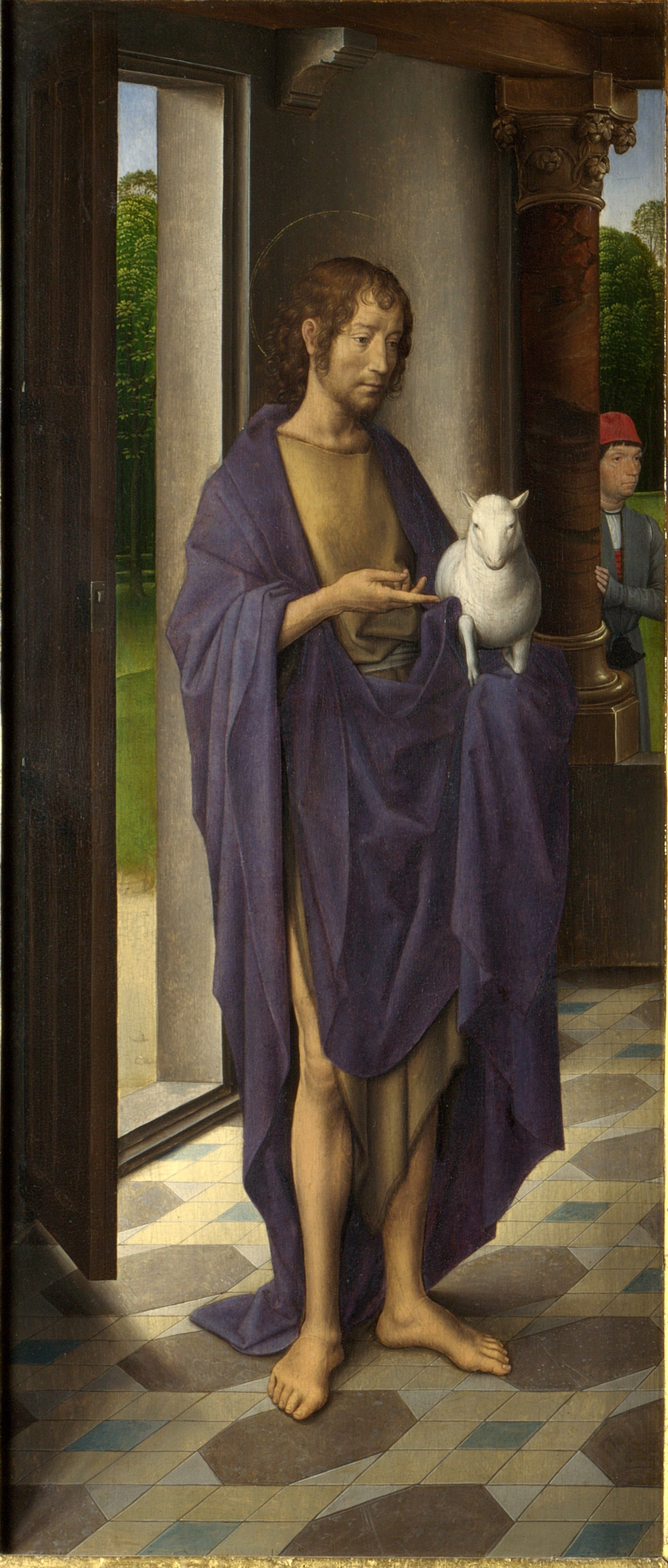
Portrait of a man in a red hat standing behind Saint John the Baptist in the left panel

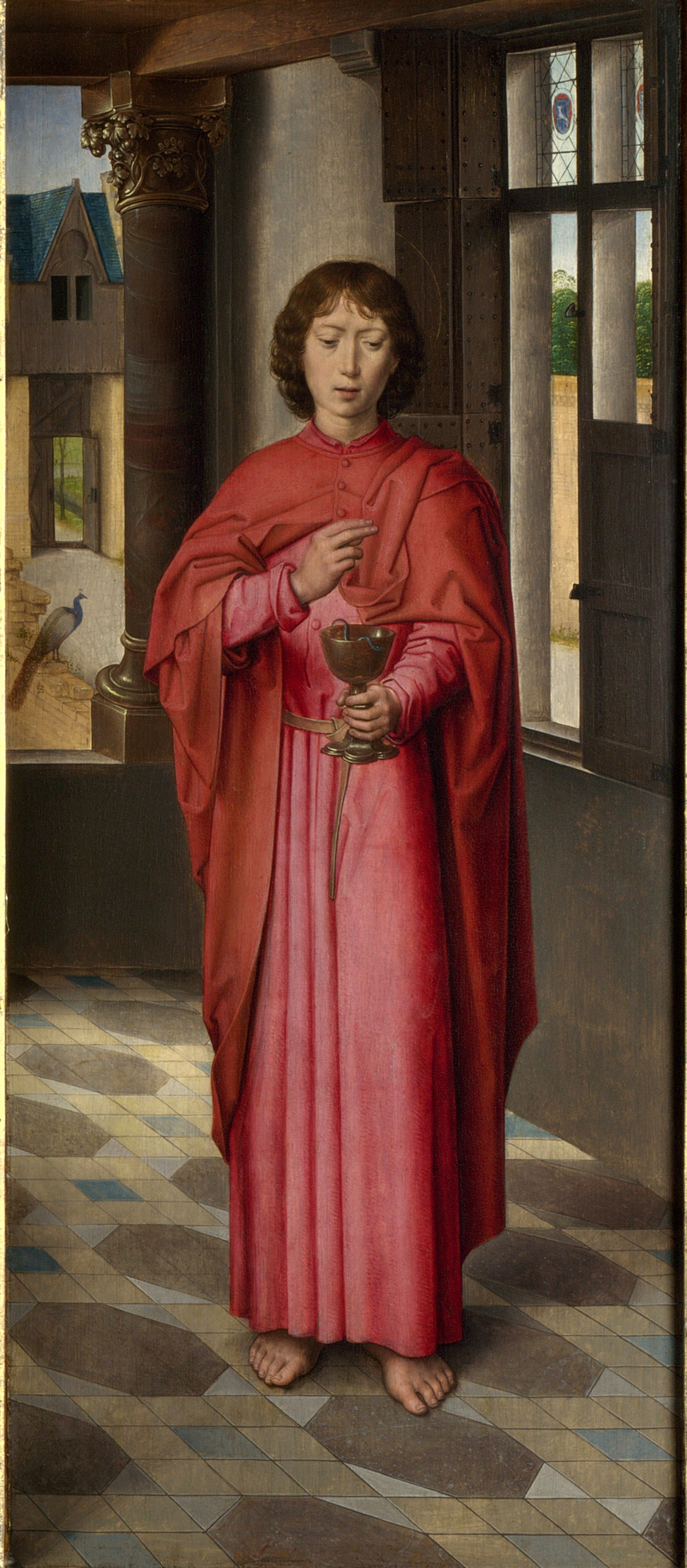
Saint John the Evangelist, along with a peacock in the background and Donne's coat of arms in the stained glass windows (Right Panel)

=== Right panel ===
On the right side, Saint John the Evangelist is seen with a cup. Saint John the Evangelist is the Patron Saint of love, of loyalty, of friendships, and of authors. In the background, there is a peacock surrounded by a ruined building. Scholars have suggested that the peacock symbolizes as eternity rising. Memling makes use of these abandon in other works, such as Diptych with the Allegory of True Love and Munich Scenes from the Advent and Triumph of Christ.

John the Evangelist can be seen in the shutters in the right panel. He also can be seen making the sign of the cross with a poisoned cup. St. John the Evangelist's presence may have been due to a long medieval tradition of combining the two St. Johns as it's believed that John the Evangelist reinforces the patronage of St. John the Baptist. This is believed due to the sharing of names, but also due to that St. John the Evangelist died on the day that St. John the Baptist was born.

== Style and technique ==
The Donne Triptych exhibits underdrawing that reveals the evolution of its composition, highlighting differences between the underdrawing and the final painting, as well as changes within the underdrawing itself, which provide insights into the creative process of the artist. The style and extent of the underdrawing suggest the use of workshop patterns combined with individualized adjustments for specific commissioned works.

The composition likely relied on pre-existing drawings and workshop patterns for its overall design and intricate details, such as figures and textiles. In the case of commissioned pieces, it was customary to present a drawing or model of the proposed composition to the patron, and the transfer of the design to the panel might have been executed by workshop assistants rather than Memling himself, who likely intervened in areas of the composition without pre-existing models.

Additionally, figures, poses, and design elements were frequently reused in Memling's works and those of his workshop. A recurring design for the cloths of honor appears in the Donne Triptych and three other paintings by Memling, with identical motif sizes indicating a mechanical method of transfer. The repetition and consistency of designs, such as the brocade patterns used in the backgrounds, suggest the employment of a mechanical technique to reproduce these intricate patterns, connecting Memling's works to broader workshop practices of the time and paralleling the methods of other painters like Stephan Lochner.

=== Brush Strokes ===
Infra-red reflectograms of the Donne Triptych reveal visible brushstrokes in the priming layer beneath the paint, indicating that this layer was applied independently of the final image composition. Notably, there is an absence of the layered gesso preparation typical of fourteenth- and fifteenth-century Italian paintings, such as the coarse "gesso grosso" followed by the fine "gesso sottile." Instead, the panels of the Donne Triptych are crafted from finer-grained, higher-quality wood, which may have diminished the need for a thick ground layer.

Additionally, technical comparisons with early Netherlandish paintings, including those by Memling, show a preference for a thinner priming layer over the ground, contrasting with some Italian practices that utilized thicker preparations, especially in gilded areas or relief designs carved into the ground. The priming layer exhibits a streaky and discontinuous appearance in certain cross-sections, suggesting it was applied with visible brushstrokes, which can be detected through methods such as infra-red reflectograms, X-radiographs, and raking light.

== Influence ==
Hans Memling was a significant figure in Northern Renaissance painting, celebrated for his intricate oil paintings and portraits that showcase the artistic advancements of the era. He made a notable impact on the evolution of portraiture and religious art, shaping how artists conveyed realism and emotion in their creations. His expertise in oil painting techniques also played a key role in the rise of smaller, portable panel paintings, enabling the production of more personal and intimate artworks.

Memling's artwork clearly illustrates the influence of his contemporaries in the art scene. He drew inspiration from the compositions of Jan van Eyck, a key figure in the Bruges school. Additionally, you can observe elements from artists like Dieric Bouts and Hugo van der Goes, characterized by features like reflective mirrors, intricate tiled floors, elaborately canopied beds, exotic textiles, and richly decorated clothing. Most importantly, Memling shows a deep comprehension of and dependence on the compositions and figure styles pioneered by Rogier van der Weyden.

== Provenance ==
The triptych was in the collection of Richard Boyle, 3rd Earl of Burlington at Chiswick House and passed through descent to the Dukes of Devonshire, moving to Chatsworth House by 1892. The National Gallery in London acquired the painting in 1957 from the Duke of Devonshire's Collection.

== Sources ==
- Bauman, Guy. "Early Flemish Portraits 1425–1525". The Metropolitan Museum of Art Bulletin, New Series, volume 43, no. 4, 1986. JSTOR 3269088
- Blum, Shirley Neilson. Early Netherlandish Triptychs: A Study in Patronage. Los Angeles: University of California Press, 1969
- Bruce, Donald. Contemporary Review. Aug 94, Vol. 265 Issue 1543, p. 72.
