= St John Altarpiece (Memling) =

Altarpiece by Hans Memling

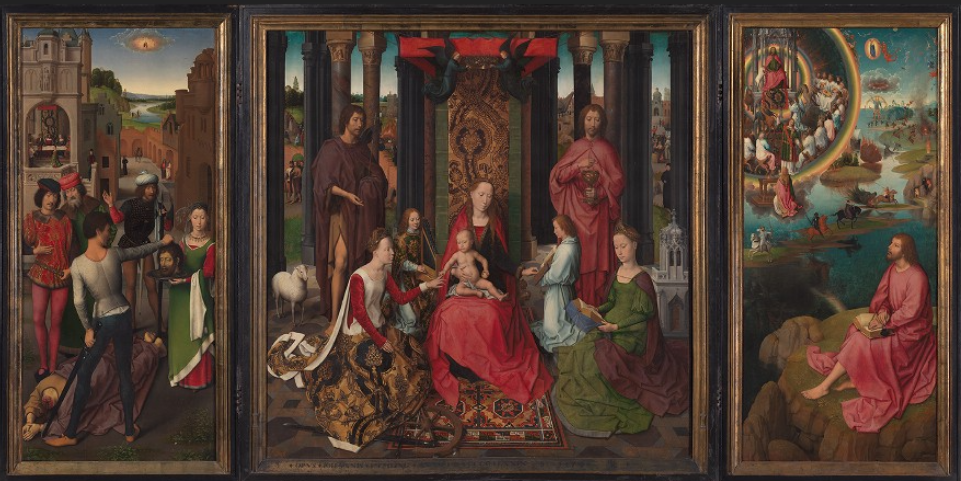
St John Altarpiece, c. 1479, oil on oak panel, 173.6 × 173.7 cm (central panel), 176 × 78.9 cm (each wing), Memlingmuseum, Sint-Janshospitaal, Bruges

The St John Altarpiece (sometimes the Triptych of the two Saints John or the Triptych of St John the Baptist and St John the Evangelist) is a large oil-on-oak hinged-triptych altarpiece completed around 1479 by the Early Netherlandish master painter Hans Memling. It was commissioned in the mid-1470s in Bruges for the Old St. John's Hospital (Sint-Janshospitaal) during the building of a new apse. It is signed and dated 1479 on the original frame – its date of installation – and is today still at the hospital in the Memling museum.

The altarpiece consists of five paintings – a central inner panel and two double-sided wings. The panels on the reverse of wings are visible when the shutters are closed, and show the hospital donors flanked by their patron saints. The interior contains a central panel with the enthroned Virgin and Child flanked by saints; the left wing features episodes from the life of John the Baptist with emphasis on his beheading; the right wing shows the apocalypse as recorded by John of Patmos, pictured writing on the island of Patmos.

St John Altarpiece is one of Memling's more ambitious works, and shares near-identical scenes with two of other his works: the Donne Triptych, in London's National Gallery, and the Virgin and Child with Saints Catherine of Alexandria and Barbara in the Metropolitan Museum of Art, New York.

The painting was featured in the 1980 BBC Two series 100 Great Paintings.

== Background and commission ==
Memling's St Barbara might be an early likeness of Margaret of York.

Hans Memling purchased citizenship in Bruges late in January 30, 1465, suggesting he was a recent arrival to the city. He probably came from Brussels where he had been apprenticed to Rogier van der Weyden. He became established as a painter in Bruges fairly quickly. Although it appears he was absent from the city for Charles the Bold and Margaret of York's rather extravagant 1468 wedding, art historian James Weale suggests that Memling may have travelled to England to complete a bridal portrait commissioned either by Charles the Bold or his father Philip the Good. According to Weale, Memling's position in Bruges was secured by the Dukes of Burgundy.

Old St. John's Hospital (Sint-Janshospitaal) was one of four public hospitals in the city; one took in lepers, one paupers, and two – including St John's – treated men, women, and children. Established at the end of the 12th century, it was dedicated to John the Evangelist; at an unknown later date the dedication was extended to include John the Baptist. The Bruges civic authorities financed the hospital and oversaw its direction until the 1440s when a fiscal crisis resulted in decreased funding and increased supervision. The hospital brothers and sisters placed themselves under the authority of the Bishop of Tournai, Jean Chevrot, directly aligned with Philip the Good. By the 1470s the hospital masters and bursars not only averted bankruptcy, but accrued a surplus to spend on expansion.

Commissioned for the new apse, work on the altarpiece was probably begun in the mid-1470s, and was almost certainly completed in 1479. The central frame is inscribed in Latin and reads; OPUS. IOHANNES MEMLING. ANNO. M. CCCC. LXXIX, The date gives clues to the identities of donors shown on the exterior panels; and because one died in 1475, scholars are confident in a start date before that year. Memling probably began work on the piece as early as 1473, when plans were made to extend the already large 240-bed infirmary, which, with two patients per bed, served about 500 people. As at the Hospices de Beaune, patients in Sint-Janshospitaal could follow the Liturgy of the Hours from their beds.

The altarpiece's prestigious location, coupled with its scope and execution, secured additional commissions for Memling. The Augustinian prelates, who were allowed to own property, ordered several later works from him, including the St Ursula Shrine, the Triptych of Jan Floreins, and the Triptych of Adriaan Reins – each still located in the hospital. They are today displayed in the Memling museum, in a room adjacent to the original infirmary. Unusually, the altarpiece in retains its original frames, but the panel's have suffered from extensive overcleaning.

== Exterior panels ==
The convention for exterior panels, visible when the wings were closed, was to show a pair of saints or donors gazing at saints. These deviate from that convention, depicting the donors looking directly at each other. Art historians speculate Memling emphasized the opening between the shutters with the donors's gazes, thereby directing attention to the importance of the devotional scenes visible on the insides when the winged shutters were opened.

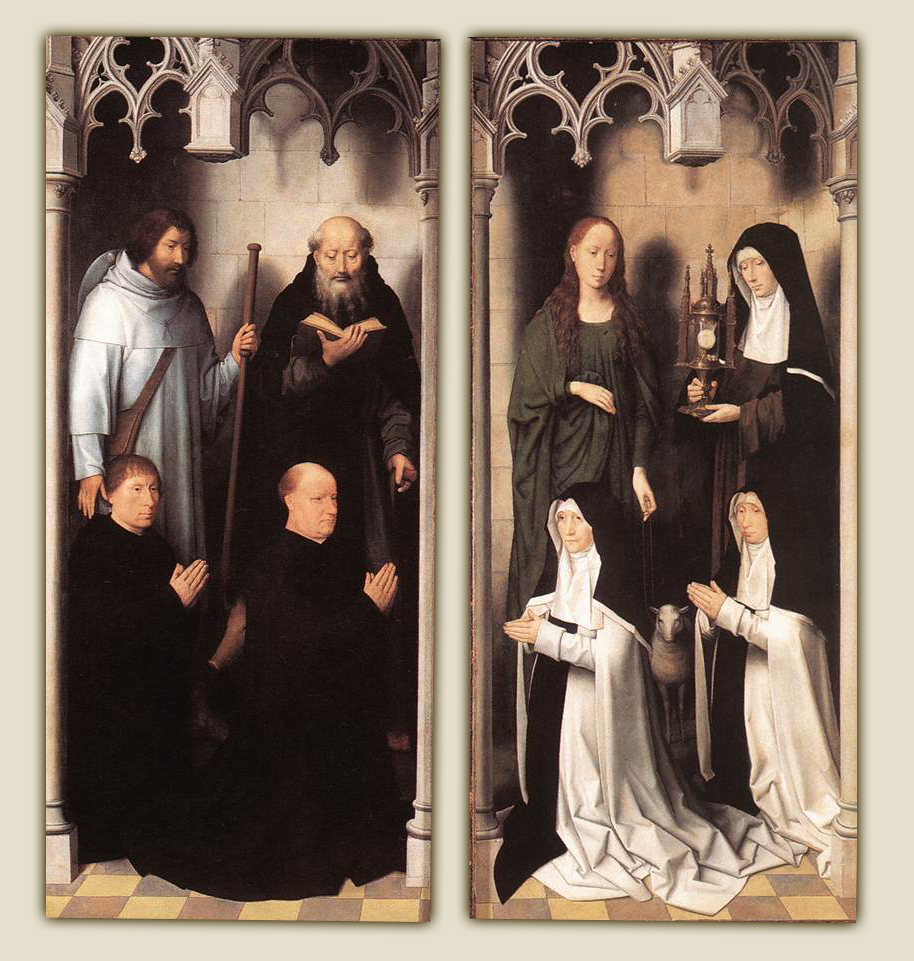
With the shutters closed, the two outer panels reveal the donors kneeling in front of their patron saints

St Anthony Abbot was in the Middle Ages commonly associated with sickness and ergotism (sometimes known as "St Anthony's Fire"), but also with the concept of miraculous healing. He is shown on the left hand panel with his emblematic pig, next to St James; the two saints stand behind two kneeling male donors. The donors have been identified as Anthony Seghers, master of the hospital, and Brother James Ceuninc. Seghers joined the hospital as a brother in 1445, and by 1461 had risen to hospital master, a position he held intermittently until his death in 1475. He faces the center of the panel, flanked by his patron saint, Anthony, who leans on a tau staff with one hand and holds a bible in the other. Ceunic, a hospital brother from 1469 and bursar between 1488 and 1490, kneels to the left behind Seghers. His patron saint, James, is identifiable by his attributes of pilgrim's staff and hat, and stands behind him.

The right panel shows St Agnes and St Clare standing behind the female donors, Agnes Casembrood, hospital prioress, and sister Clara van Hulson. Casembrood faces the center. She joined the hospital in 1447, became prioress in 1455, and remained in that office until her death in 1489. Her namesake, St Agnes, is identified by the lamb at her side. Van Hulson was a hospital sister from 1427 until she died in 1479; she kneels in front of St Clare who holds a monstrance.

Unlike his predecessors Jan van Eyck and Rogier van der Weyden, who typical painted exterior wings in grisaille, Memling presents the saints in a realistic manner. Although the donors in van Eyck's Ghent Altarpiece and van der Weyden's Beaune Altarpiece are also painted realistically, they are placed within architectural niches separate from the adjacent statue-like grisaille saints. Memling breaks with that tradition in these exterior panels, but the subdued palette he uses retains some sense of grisaille. The donors are dressed in their Augustinian habits; the two men in stark black and the two women in white on black. The saints are dressed in monochromatic clothing. St James wears a light blue cloak and St Anthony's is grey. St Agnes is dressed in drab green and St Clare is also in a dark habit. Although the figures seem to be in two niches, they are enclosed in a single shallow space, with stone walls behind, trefoil arches above, and two columns adorning the outermost edges. Where the wings open is a single column which has the appearance of two separate columns.

Netherlandish art in the 15th century was typically devotional. It was intended to draw the viewer into a meditative state and perhaps even the "experience of miraculous visions." Art historian Craig Harbison believes Memling, by comparison to van der Weyden, is "less exalted", more "down-to-earth" and that the exterior panels in this piece might represent a popularization of van der Weyden's earlier concepts. Memling clearly shows the donors set apart from the religious vision on the interior panels. The transition from the earthly to the heavenly realm, earlier represented in grisaille sculpture in van Eyck's and van der Weyden's work, is here less obvious. The St John Altarpiece has been criticized for having the donors merely "praying to a crack" but Harbison contends that Memling clearly shows the distinction between the worldly figures on the exterior and the biblical figures on the interior panels, and clarifies the "levels of reality" between the two sets of images. Harbison writes of Memling that "he has implied more strongly than earlier artists that it is donors' prayers which bridge the gap or crack leading to the visionary heart of the triptych." The panels within were meant to provide a personal religious vision to the donors on the outside.

== Interior panels ==
When opened, the hinged doors of the wing panels reveal a vividly colored interior. The central focus is the enthroned Virgin and Child with saints; the left panel depicts the decapitation of John the Baptist with John the Evangelist opposite on the right. As a devotional piece it presents a narrative, meant to emulate a vision the donors or viewers would experience when viewing the inside panels. Unlike most altarpieces of these types, Memling's fails to present a single unifying iconographical focus and is quite generalized with themes that seem unsuited for its specific location, according to Blum. She speculates the donors may have chosen the specific iconography, which "celebrated intercessory saints on the interior". It is an unusual painting in that it seems to "have served a double function: that of personal propitiation and that of public altarpiece, which portrayed the role of the religious community within the hospital and venerated the saints who might particularly favor the sick".

The iconography conveys the hospital's brothers' and sisters' daily lives, including both their quiet religious devotion and their struggle against illness; borne out in the choice of patron saints. John the Evangelist with book in hand, represents the quiet, contemplative life; John the Baptist's beheading is a scene of action, and, according to Blum, "the final dramatic end to one of the most active lives of any Christian saint".

The panels capture the essence of Memling's style, which Ridderbos describes as serene and filled with "sublime peace". The Baptist's decapitation portrayed by Memling, is subdued and restrained, and the apocalyptic scenes on the opposite panel are "more poetic than horrific". Maryan Ainsworth says it shows a carefully balanced composition, painted in light clear colors. Memling catered to foreign patrons, most of whom were Italian, and he became known for his unique style that combined southern Italian elements with those of the northern Netherlandish tradition. He juxtaposed "an Italianate monumentality and simplification of form with a northern sense of atmosphere and light in a format that often placed his subjects before a charming locally inspired landscape background", according to Ainsworth.

=== Mystic marriage of St Catherine ===
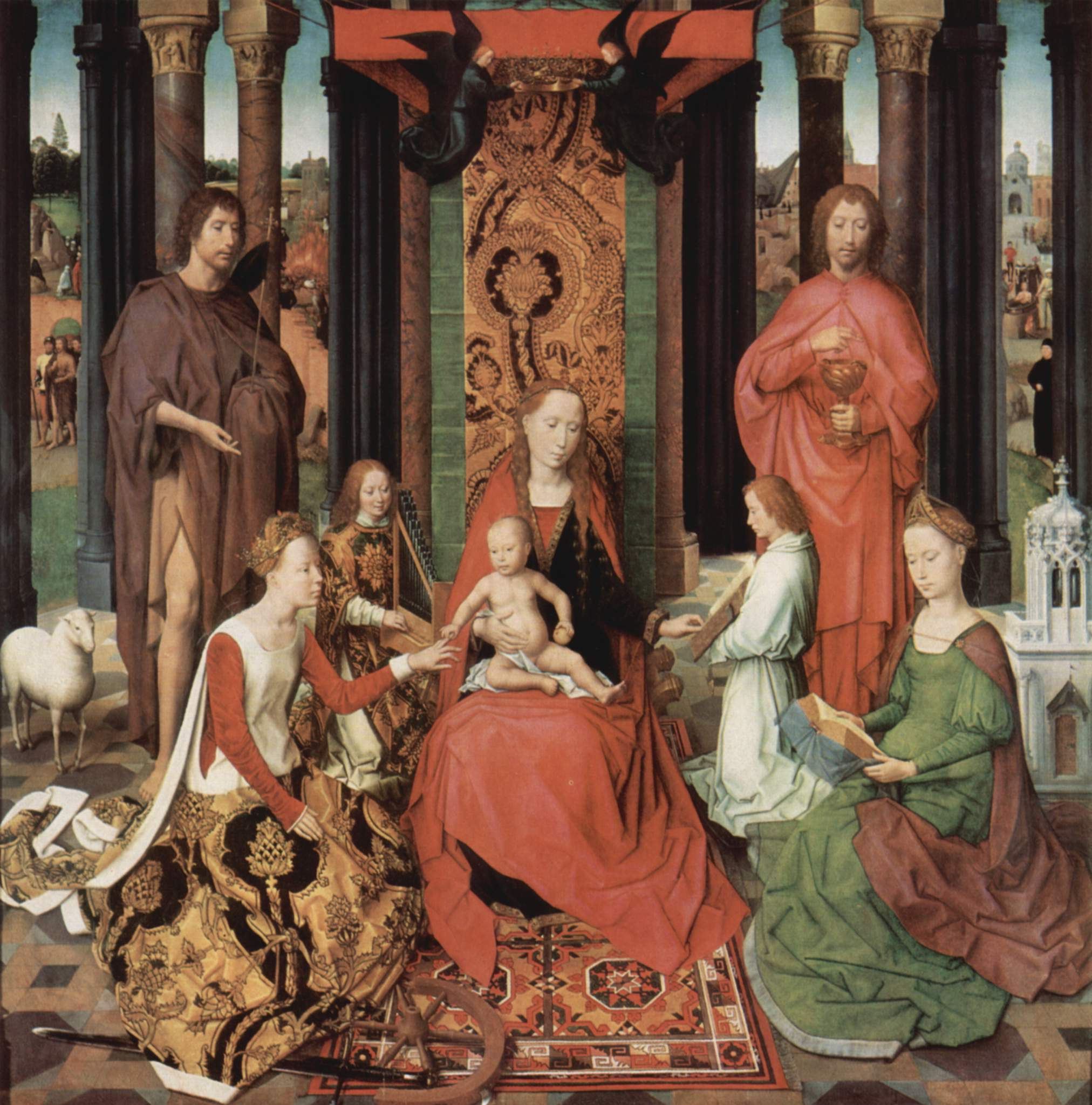
The central panel, known as The Mystic Marriage of St. Catherine, depicts the Virgin enthroned with Child. Saints Catherine and Barbara sit before her, John the Baptist and John the Evangelist stand behind.

The central panel, called the Mystic Marriage of St Catherine, depicts Mary seated on a throne beneath a baldachin covered with sumptuous brocade. Two seraphim hover directly beneath the canopy, holding her crown; they wear deep blue robes, and in the uncleaned version have blue faces and hands, a style evocative of earlier Netherlandish painters such as van der Weyden and Robert Campin. The Christ child sits on his mother's lap, holding an apple in one hand and slipping the ring on St Catherine's finger to signify the mystic marriage with the other hand.

St Catherine of Alexandria, the patron saint of nuns, sits to the left of the throne with her emblems, the breaking wheel on which she was tortured and the sword used for her beheading. She wears a crown and is dressed in a surcoat over a costly brocade skirt, symbols of royal status. St Barbara, patron of soldiers, sits opposite reading a missal in front of her emblem (the tower in which her father held her prisoner), which is shaped as a monstrance meant to hold the sacramental bread. Weale thought Catherine was an early portrait of Mary of Burgundy and that Memling's Barbara is perhaps the earliest likeness of Margaret of York.

The central panel is usually considered to be a sacra conversazione (Virgin and Child with female and male saints) and less often as a Virgo inter Virgines (Virgin and Child with virgin saints); Memling's imagery blurs the lines between the two, and does not strictly adhere to either convention. A subgenre of the more established sacra conversazione, Virgo inter Virgines became popular in Germany and the Low Countries in the 15th century. Conventionally set within an enclosed garden (Hortus conclusus), the Virgin and Child were always shown with Saints Catherine and Barbara, Catherine's mystic marriage was frequently shown, while Virgin saints might also be added to the grouping. Often referred to as the "Mystic Marriage of St Catherine", the marriage itself is one of great number of iconographical depictions in the panel yet might be particularly important to the nuns, who, like Catherine saw themselves wedded to Christ.

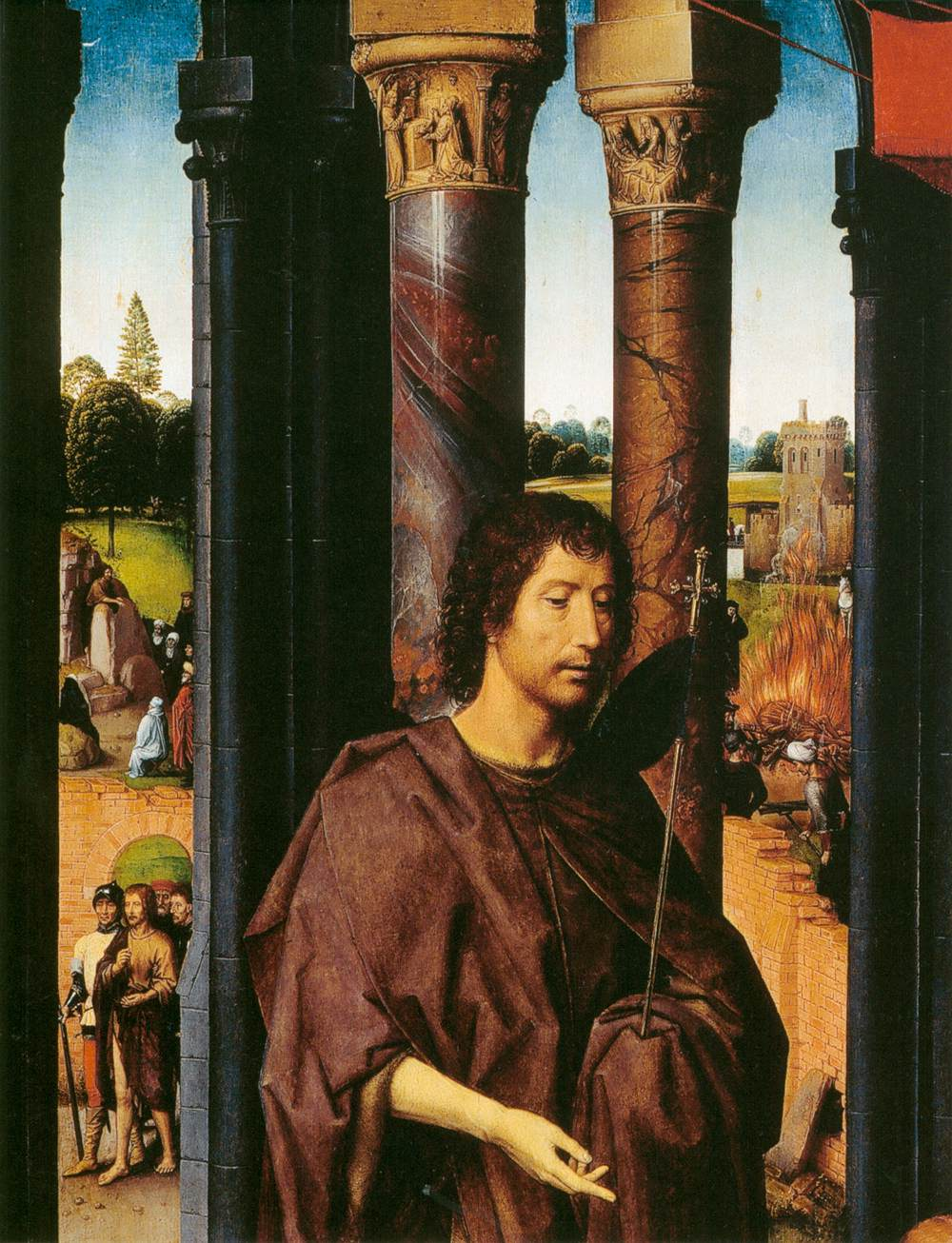
St John the Baptist in the foreground with events of his life depicted beyond

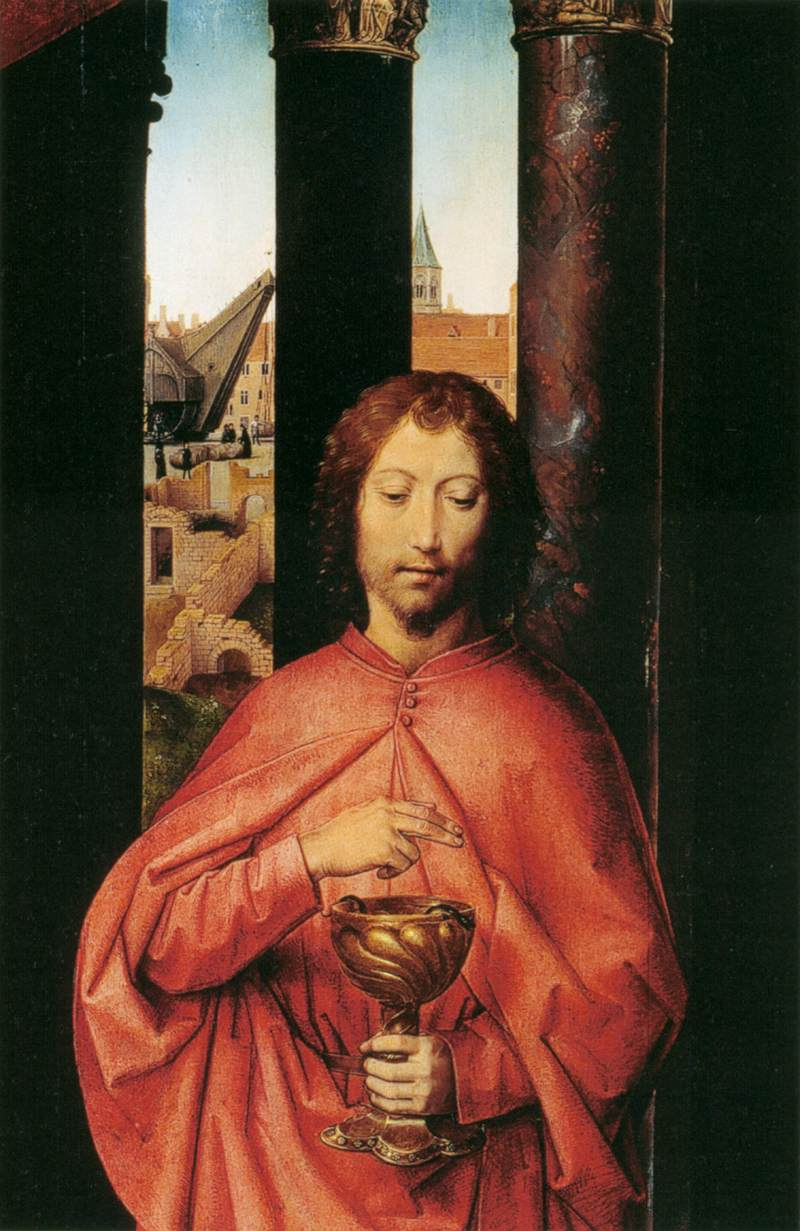
St John the Evangelist holding the poisoned chalice

The two St Johns stand either side of the throne. On the left, John the Baptist points at the Christ Child and holds a staff with his lamb beside him. John the Evangelist, holding the poisoned chalice, is on the right. An angel in an expensive gold brocade dalmatic plays a portable organ in front of John the Baptist; another angel, wearing a simple alb and holding the Book of Wisdom for the Virgin, is in front of John the Evangelist. The cloistered space is lined with pillars with representations from the lives of the two Johns. The capitals on the pillars above John the Baptist show the vision of his father Zachariah and the Baptist's Nativity; above the Evangelist are the Drinking of the Cup by the Priest of Diana and the Resurrection of Drusiana.

The floor tiles are highly decorated. The Virgin's throne sits on a Memling carpet extending almost to the front of the pictorial space. Behind her is a cityscape, and in the far background, a landscape. The city is probably 15th-century Bruges and contains contemporary scenes as well as episodes from the lives of two Johns. John the Baptist is shown in a wilderness, preaching to a crowd, led to prison, and burning on a fire. The Evangelist is placed in a church with his wife and disciples kneeling behind him, leaving for Patmos, and immersed in burning oil.

The more mundane and secular activities in the background, as evidenced by the image of the city crane used by the hospital to measure and fill wine barrels, place the altarpiece's spiritual vision in a worldly context. The measuring of wine was a lucrative concession given to the hospital by the city authorities during the mid-1300s and in the 1470s the hospital secured the right to fish in the Reye river – both activities shown in the far background. The figure of the hospital brother has been variously identified as Jan Floreins or Josse Willems; both held the position of the hospital's wine measurer and so were associated with the crane.

=== John the Baptist ===
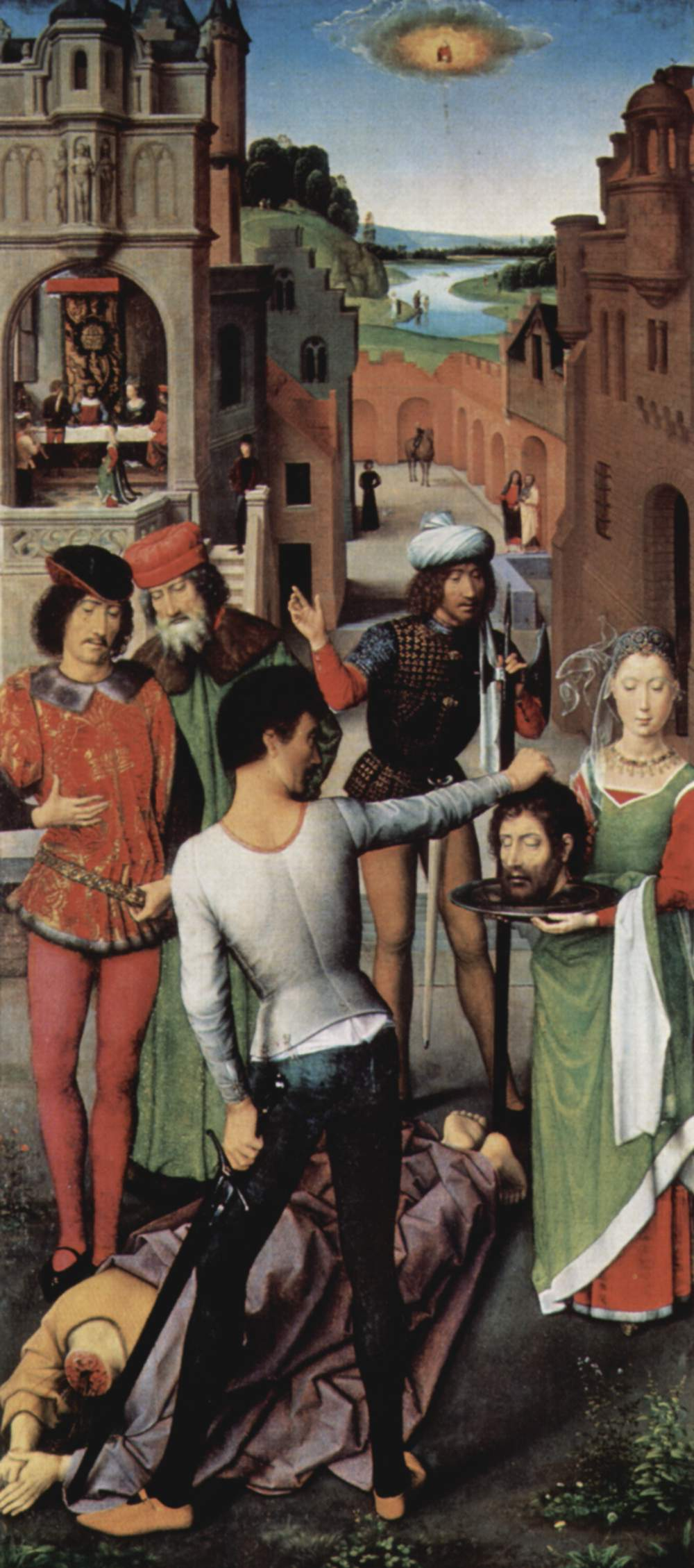
Salome receives John the Baptist's head from the executioner

The left wing depicts the beheading of St John the Baptist. His headless body lies in the left foreground and seems to reach out of the picture, as blood spurts from his severed neck, spraying his hands and the nearby plants. The foreground in the flora are reduced to the extent that they could not have been painted without a magnifying glass. The executioner stands with his back to the viewer, placing the freshly severed head on Salome's platter. The executioner, Salome, and three gesticulating bystanders form a circle around John's headless and lifeless body. According to Ridderbos, the five figures mirror and create a sense of unity with the five holy figures in the central panel. The scene is set in a courtyard in front of Herod's palace; the banquet that preceded the Baptist's decapitation can be seen in the left-midground of the palace, where minstrels play for Salome's dance. The scene is well-lit and with good architectural perspective. Albert Michiels described Salome as ravishing but emotionless; she receives the head, with her eyes held aloof. Other versions of St John's beheading (decollation) more typically showed Salome holding an empty plate for the executioner; with an early version typified in a miniature in the Petites Heures of Jean de France, Duc de Berry.

Carvings of St John's head on a dish were popular from the 13th to 16th centuries and were made of various materials, some quite expensive. The Duke of Berry owned one made from gold. The head on the dish assumed eucharistic connotations, and is mentioned in the York breviary; "St John's head on the dish signifies the body of Christ which feeds us on the holy altar". The head became associated with the host and Salome's charger with the paten – iconography that appeared in Early Netherlandish art from about 1450.

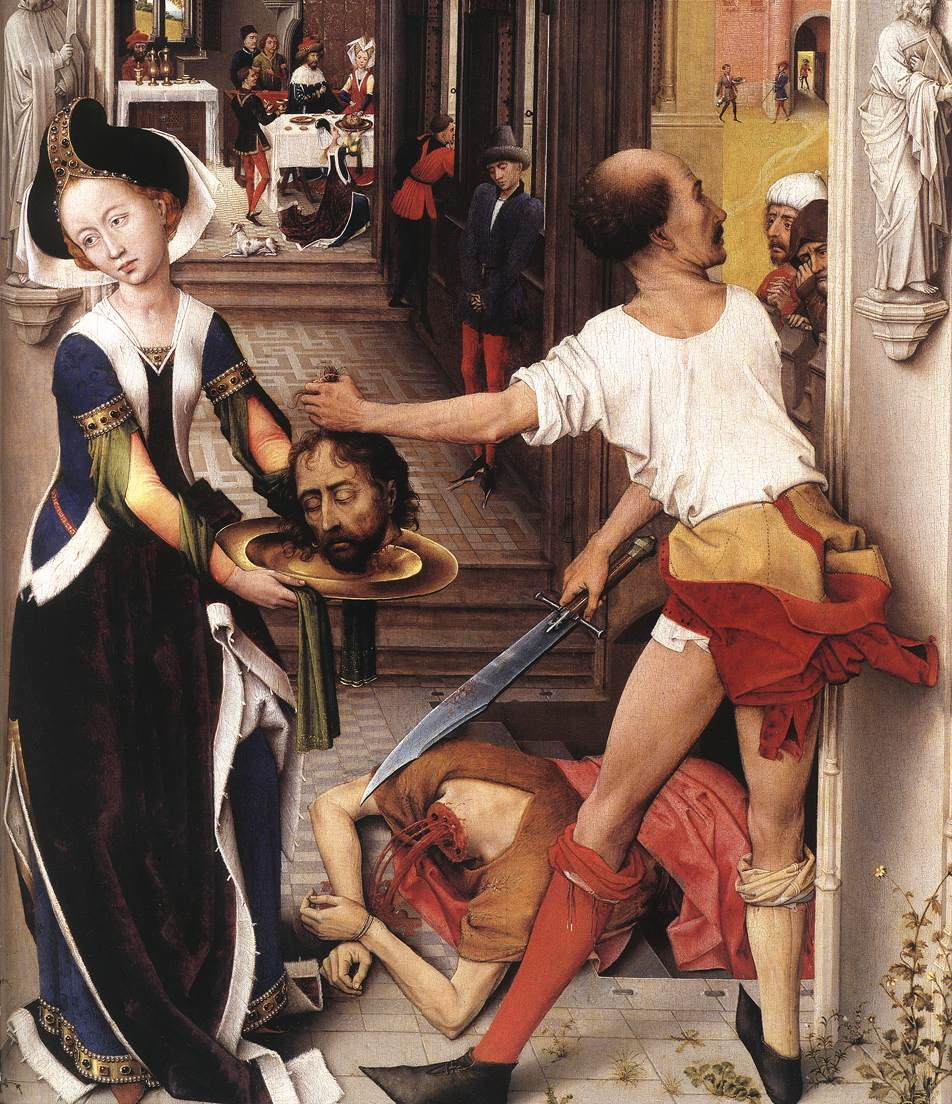
Detail from Rogier van der Weyden's Saint John Altarpiece, showing Salome and the executioner averting their gaze from the head on the platter

The heads in these paintings resemble carvings, as in van der Weyden's Saint John Altarpiece. Van der Weyden's depiction of St John's beheading includes the next sequence in the event: Salome delivering the head to the banquet table where her mother, Herodias, stabs it. Furthermore, van der Weyden follows the prevailing iconography with Salome and the executioner, who were pagan and thus not permitted to look at the head (or that which it symbolized), twisting away and averting their gaze. In Memling's version, the executioner looks directly at the head as he places it on the charger and Salome only partially averts her eyes. Barbara Lane speculates that although Memling patterned the scene after van der Weyden's, he "misunderstood the symbolism".

The background extends the landscape in the central panel. In the far distance we can see the River Jordan with the Baptism of Jesus by John and as the skies open; the divine Dove, symbol of God the Holy Spirit, descending from heaven. John introduces Andrew and James to Christ on the riverbank, the same two apostles who are in Herod's courtyard, where they visited the Baptist during his imprisonment.

=== John the Evangelist ===
The right panel depicts John the Evangelist on the island of Patmos, recording his visions of the apocalypse in a book. The rest of the panel shows "with astonishing literalness" the most important events from the Book of Revelation, chapters four to twelve (Revelation 4-12). As with the two other two panels, Memling presents a series of events in narrative form. The Evangelist looks up at Heaven; the detail of his vision "unfold in a series of events at sea, on land, and in the air". The panel's detail is so densely packed, that according to Ridderbos it requires the Book of Revelations. Weale writes of the panel that it is perhaps the "earliest example of so many of the incidents being included in one picture".

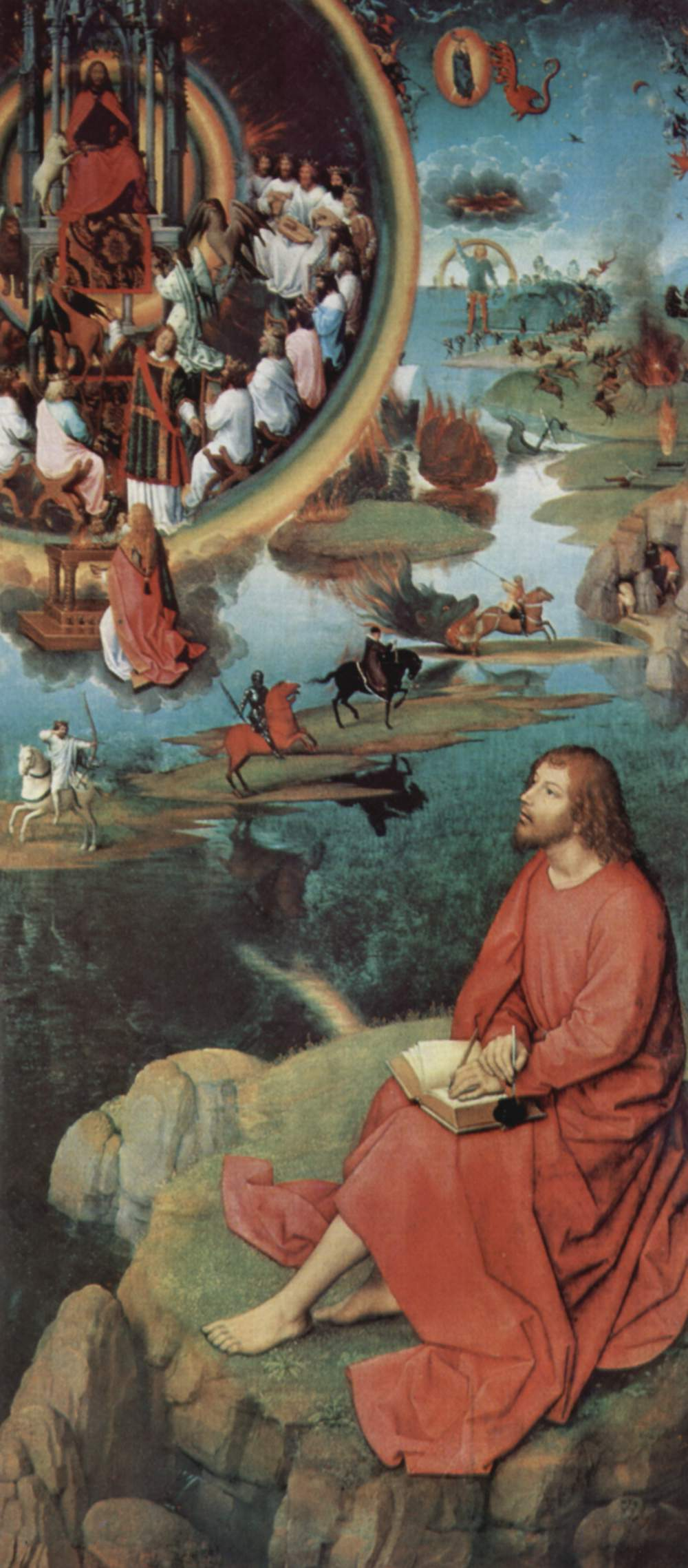
John the Evangelist on Patmos and visions of the apocalypse

The Evangelist sits on a rocky cliff in the foreground; he gazes at two concentric rainbows in the top left corner, in which God is enthroned, surrounded by the symbols of the four evangelists and 24 elders. The inner rainbow, with God's throne, flashes with lightning; above are seven lamps. He holds a book with the seven seals on his lap; the Lamb of God stands on rear legs to his left, breaking the book's seals with its forelegs. Seven angels above the rainbow blow the seven trumpets, heralding the events unfolding below on earth. The 24 elders are seated within the outer rainbow. An angel stands in front of them, announcing the breaking of the seals, casting fire towards earth, which causes the disasters heralded by the trumpeting angels. Outside the rainbows, another angel kneels at an altar, who gazes up towards God.

In the mid-ground below on a sea, which Ridderbos likens to glass crystal, are the apparitions released as the seals are broken; the Four Horsemen of the Apocalypse gallop across the flat islands, "scattering, spoiling, and slaying". These riders, which manifest as the first four seals are broken, are set at a diagonal in the pictorial space. The white horse of victory carries an archer, the red horse of war a swordsman, the black horse of famine a man with scales, and from the mouth of hell emerges the pale horse of death.

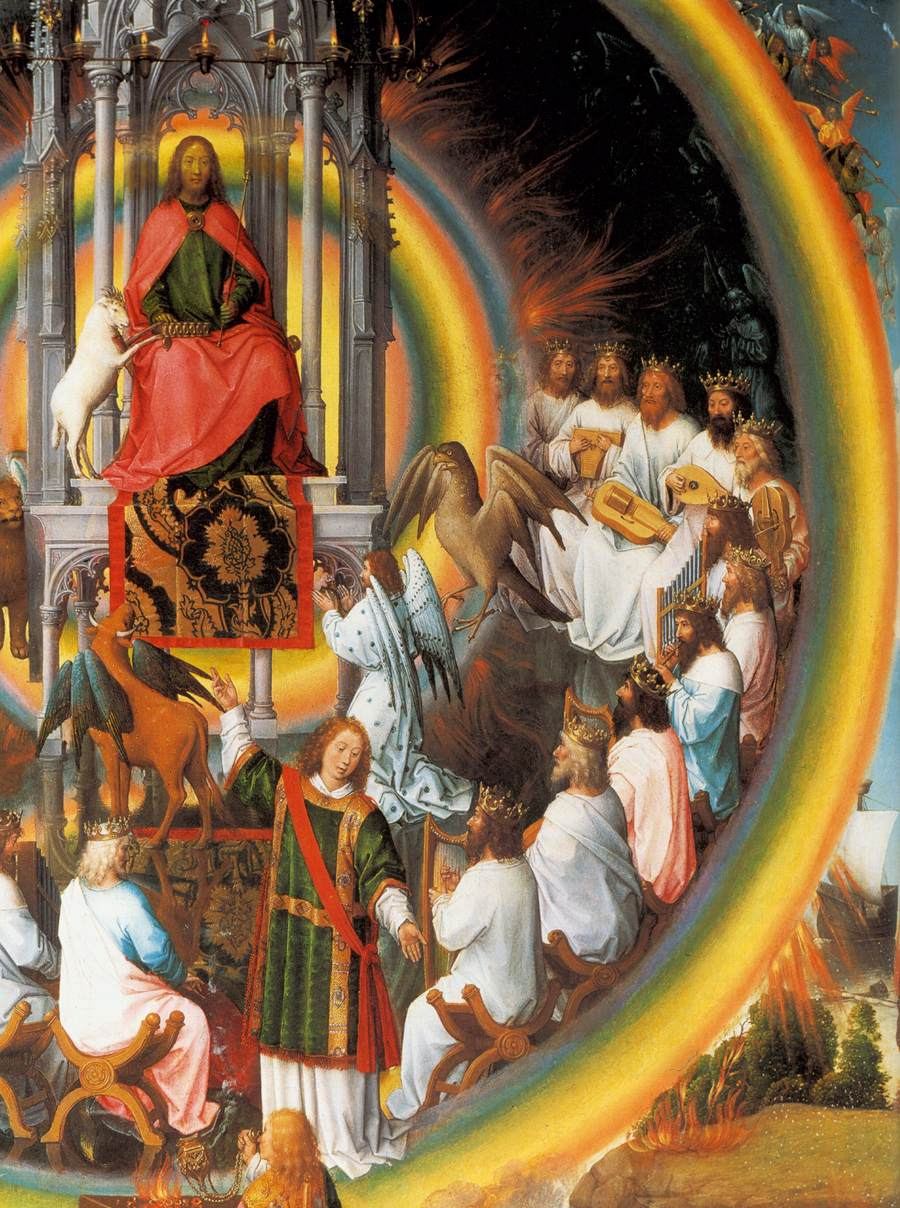
Detail of enthroned God within a rainbow, the Lamb of God breaking the seven seals, the 24 elders seated in a semi-circle

Stars fall from the sky, mountains and islands move, ships sink, and people hide in caverns. According to Ridderbos, "We see hail and fire burning trees and grass, a burning mountain cast into the sea destroying ships, a falling star that poisons the waters, a wailing eagle, a second falling star that opens a bottomless pit from which monstrous locusts arise, and four angels and their horsemen sent out to kill". Behind the armored angels on land, with one leg in the sea, the other on land, "stands a colossal figure: the angel described as clothed with a cloud, with a rainbow upon his head, a face like the sun and legs like pillars of fire", who brings down seven thunders as can be seen in the dark clouds above.

In the sky above a woman "clothed with the sun, the moon under her feet, and on her head a crown of twelve stars", bearing a male child, is attacked by a ten-horned, seven-headed dragon (each head crowned), lashing its tail and bringing stars down from heaven. The next scene in the sequence is to the right as the child is rescued by an angel, and St Michael with his angels "defeat the dragon, who then pursues the woman. On the horizon it finally surrenders its power to another seven-headed beast, like a leopard, which rises from the sea", and Michael casts Satan out of heaven.

The panel is a "composition of wonderful accuracy and taste", according to Weale, and Ridderbos says the flat, two-dimensional compositions are "appropriate to their unrealistic, visionary character". The dominant and largest features are John the Evangelist recording his visions at the bottom right, and God in Heaven at the top left. The typical 15th-century depiction of the Evangelist's contemplations on Patmos is here extended to include his visions; this is, according to Blum, "the first time that John's visions had been presented in such a way in a panel painting." Versions of the Evangelist's apocalyptic visions existed in 12th- and 13th-century illuminated manuscripts and tapestries, each event depicted singly, whereas here Memling presents the visions all on one panel and therein "lies the germ of the fantastic forms that were to become the work of Bosch's innovation of the late fifteenth century."

== Adaptations ==
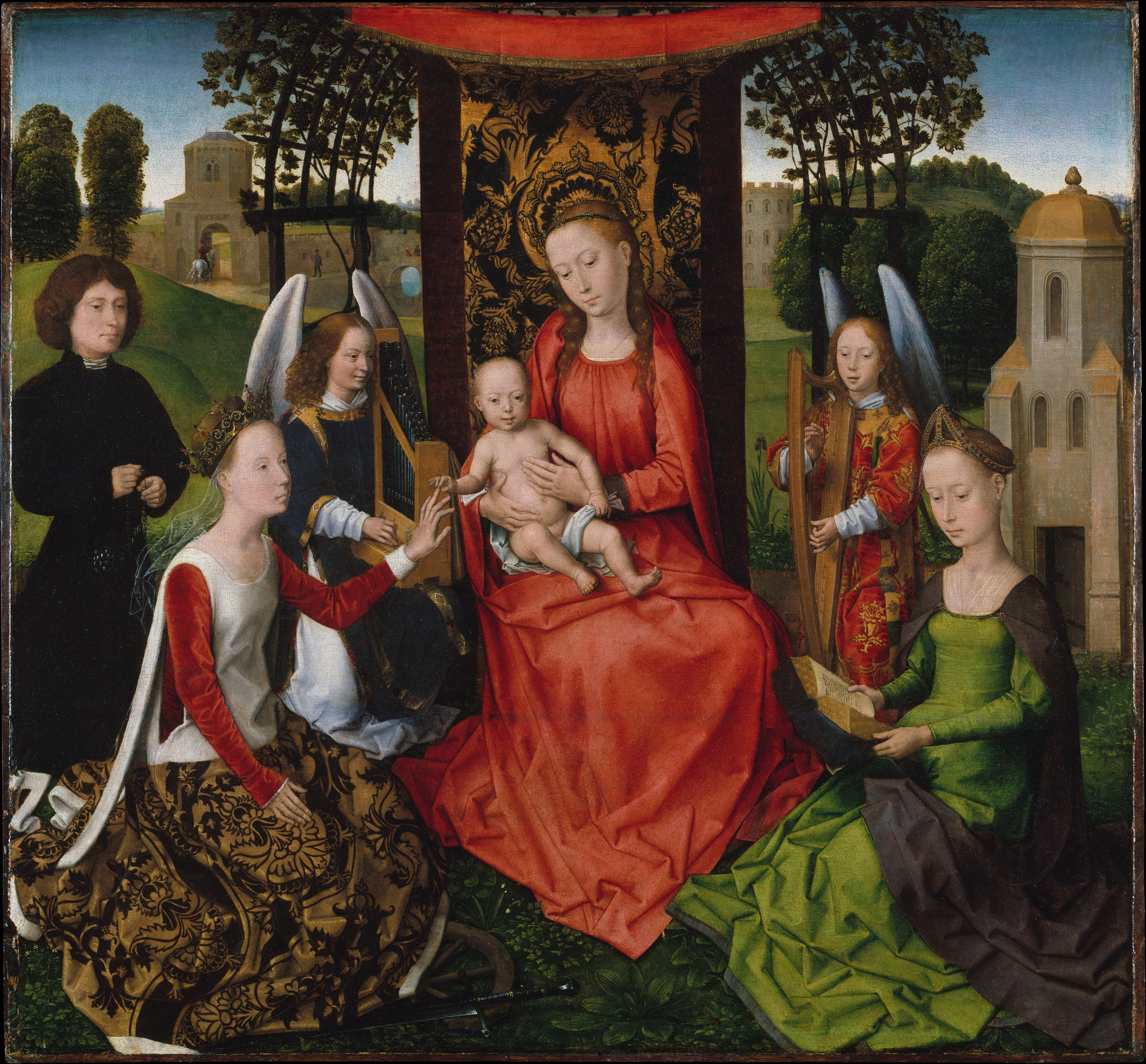
Virgin and Child with Saints Catherine of Alexandria and Barbara, at the Metropolitan Museum of Art, New York, is adapted from the central panel of The St John Altarpiece.

The altarpiece is unusual because of the degree to which Memling copied and repeated the composition's elements in other paintings. The same four saints are found in works executed between 1468 and 1489. The most similar is Virgin and Child with Saints Catherine of Alexandria and Barbara, at the Metropolitan Museum of Art, in New York. Except for the setting, which is a garden instead of a columned space, it is almost identical. Ainsworth writes aside from differences in the folds of the saints' dresses they are "virtually identical to type, costume and gesture". Art historians are uncertain when the New York panel was painted; 1480 seems a probably date according to tree ring analysis.

The Donne Triptych, held in the National Gallery in London, also has a similar setting and the same saints, but the donors are positioned with the female saints on the central panel; the two Johns are each depicted on separate wing panels. Art historians are unsure whether the Donne Triptych was painted in the early 1480s, at about the same time as Virgin and Child with Saints Catherine of Alexandria and Barbara, or in the late 1470s when the altarpiece was completed, or whether it was perhaps an earlier piece painted as a precursor to the altarpiece. Sir John Donne, a Welsh-born diplomat for the House of York, came to Bruges in 1468 to attend Charles the Bold's and Margaret of York wedding; how Donne became acquainted with Memling is as uncertain as when he commissioned the triptych, but it could possibly have occurred during the 1468 visit to Bruges.

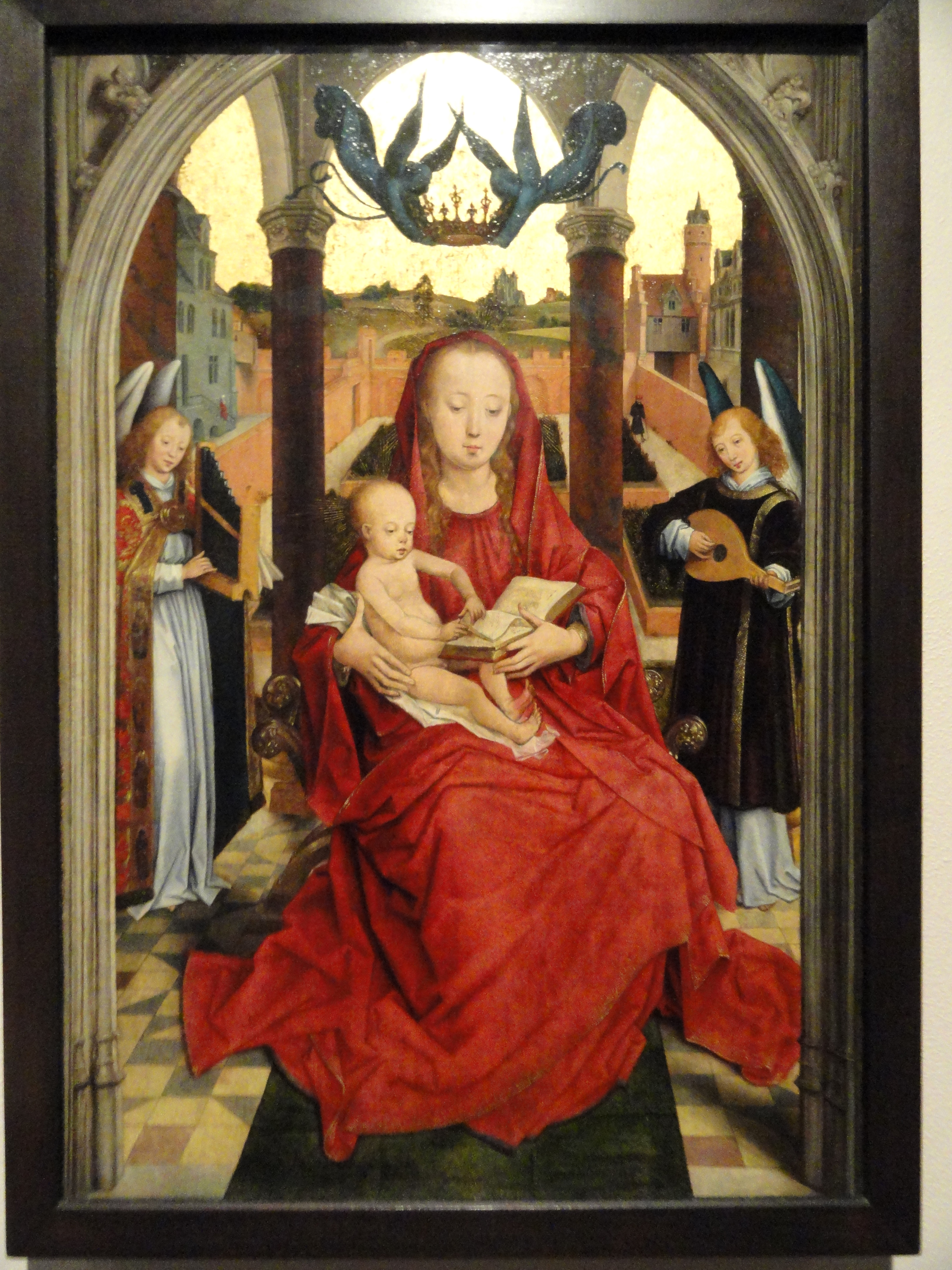
Memling's Virgin and Child Enthroned with two Musical Angels c. 1465 – 1467, shows Rogier van der Weyden's influence.

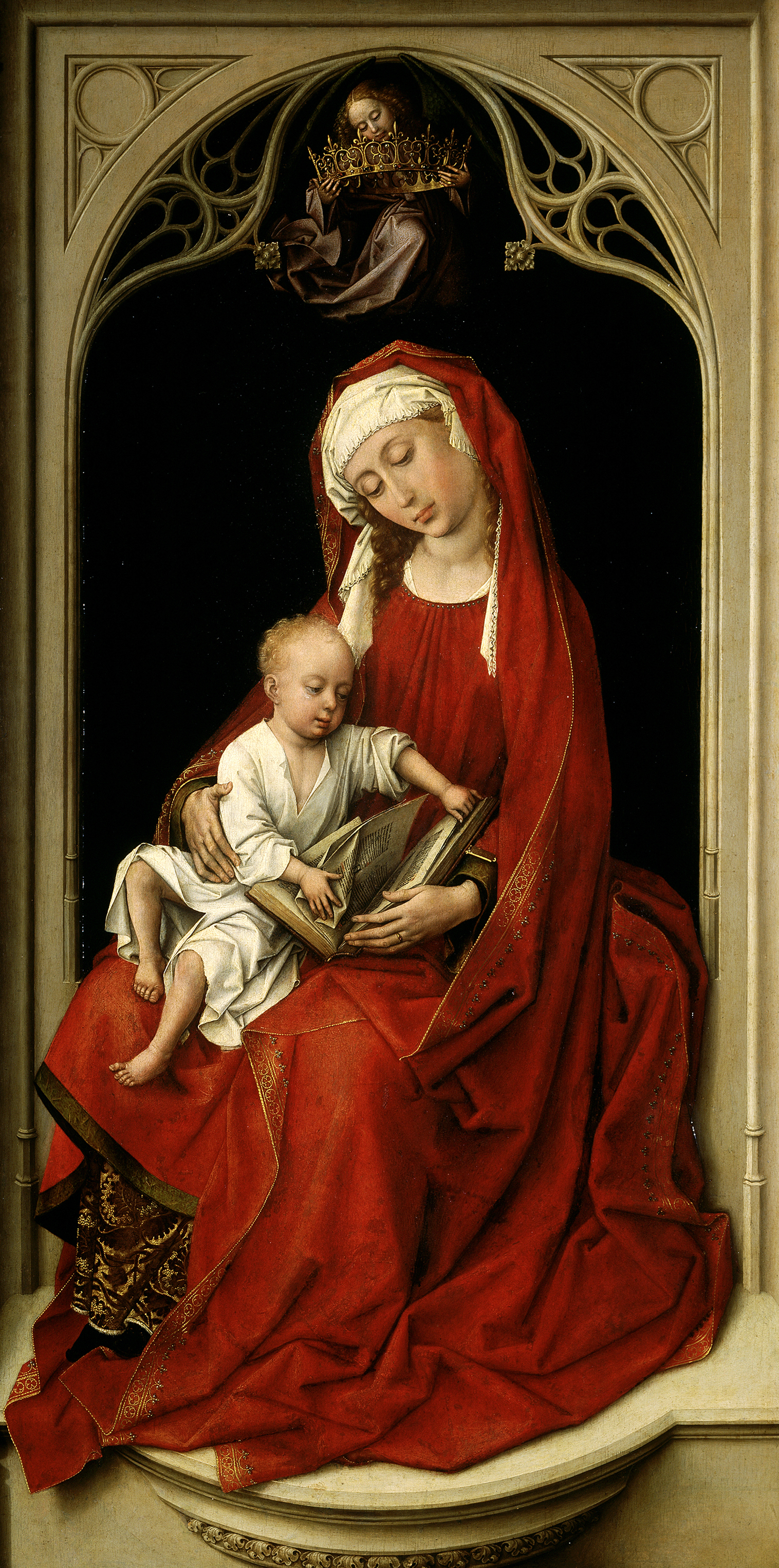
Rogier van der Weyden's Durán Madonna, c. 1435–1438, depicts a blue seraphim hovering above the Virgin and Child.

Another similar Memling work is the Diptych of Jean Cellier held at the Louvre, which Georges Hulin de Loo determined to have been completed earlier than the St John Altarpiece and the New York panel. The Cellier Diptych has the Virgin and Child in an enclosed garden with the same two Saints Catherine and Barbara on the left-hand panel. The composition is remarkably similar to the New York panel and the altarpiece, with the Virgin on her throne and St Catherine and St Barbara positioned to form a triangle. The Cellier Diptych includes four additional female saints (with attributes) sitting around the Virgin: St Agnes, St Cecilia, St Lucy, and St Margaret. Three musical angels hover above. The opposite right-hand panel, which at one time was separated, shows the donor, Jan Cellier, with John the Baptist and John the Evangelist.

Memling almost certainly took studies in his workshop to use in the central panel which he probably reused for the New York panel and the Donne Triptych. No evidence of transfer can be found on any of the three paintings; Ainsworth speculates that "Memling relied on detailed workshop drawings of figures and drapery studies from which he could copy by eye both for the rough sketch and for the finished painted details". Ainsworth sees these three paintings as the beginning of Memling's "classic phase", with balanced and harmonious compositions, and bright coloring. His ideal of female beauty is reflected in the oval faces, that are "wider across the eyes, narrowing at the chin, [and] reflect a state of beatific acceptance.

The painting is heavily influenced by van der Weyden and contains elements characteristic of his later work; it is perhaps the first of his enthroned Virgins – with angels playing musical instruments or hovering holding her crown. Mary sits in an open hall with columns leading to architectural features similar to those in the St John Altarpiece. The blend of colors, her red dress, the blue angels, and in this triptych, a dark-green silk carpet-type floor-covering, are found, repeatedly, in his later paintings. According to Blum; "We have encountered triptychs that served more than one purpose before … but we have never … seen altarpieces that repeat with very few changes the basic iconography of another work."

== Gallery ==
=== Altarpiece ===
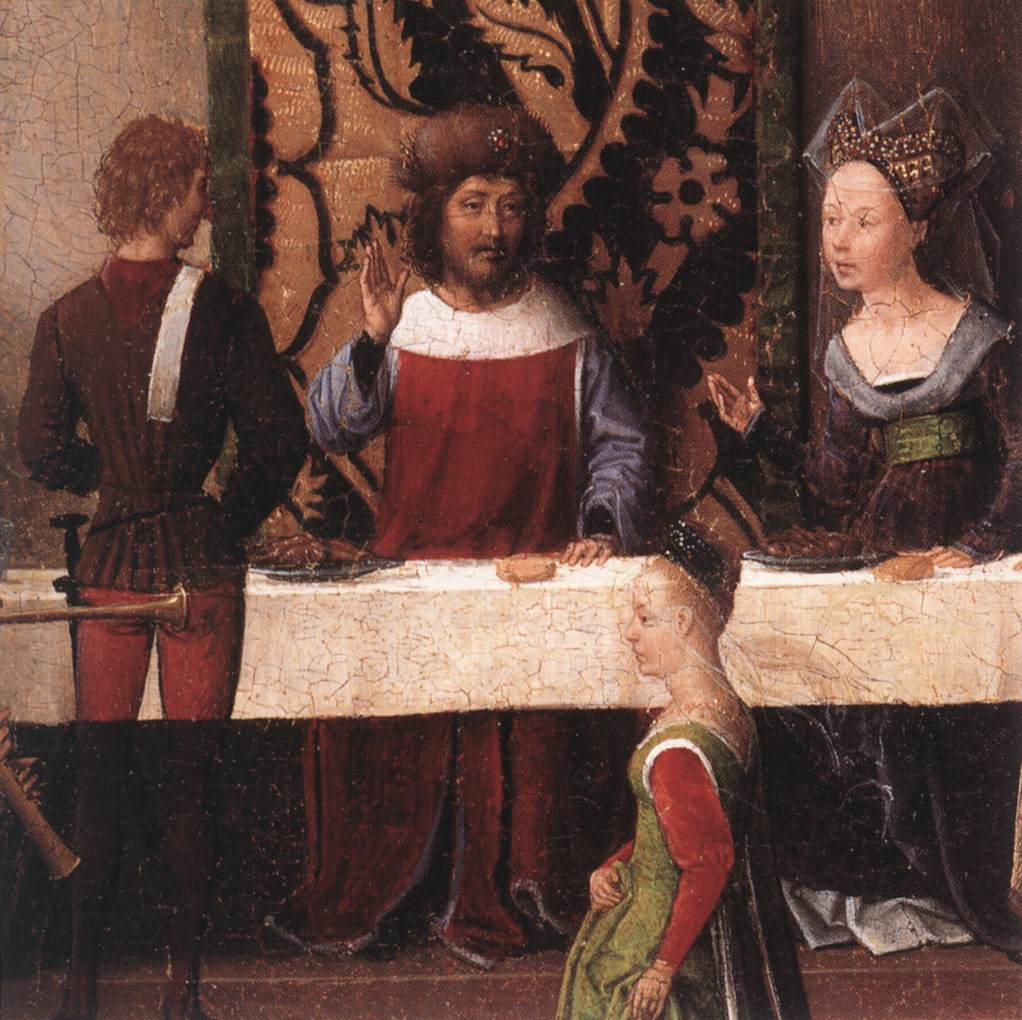
Detail, left panel, the dance of Salome

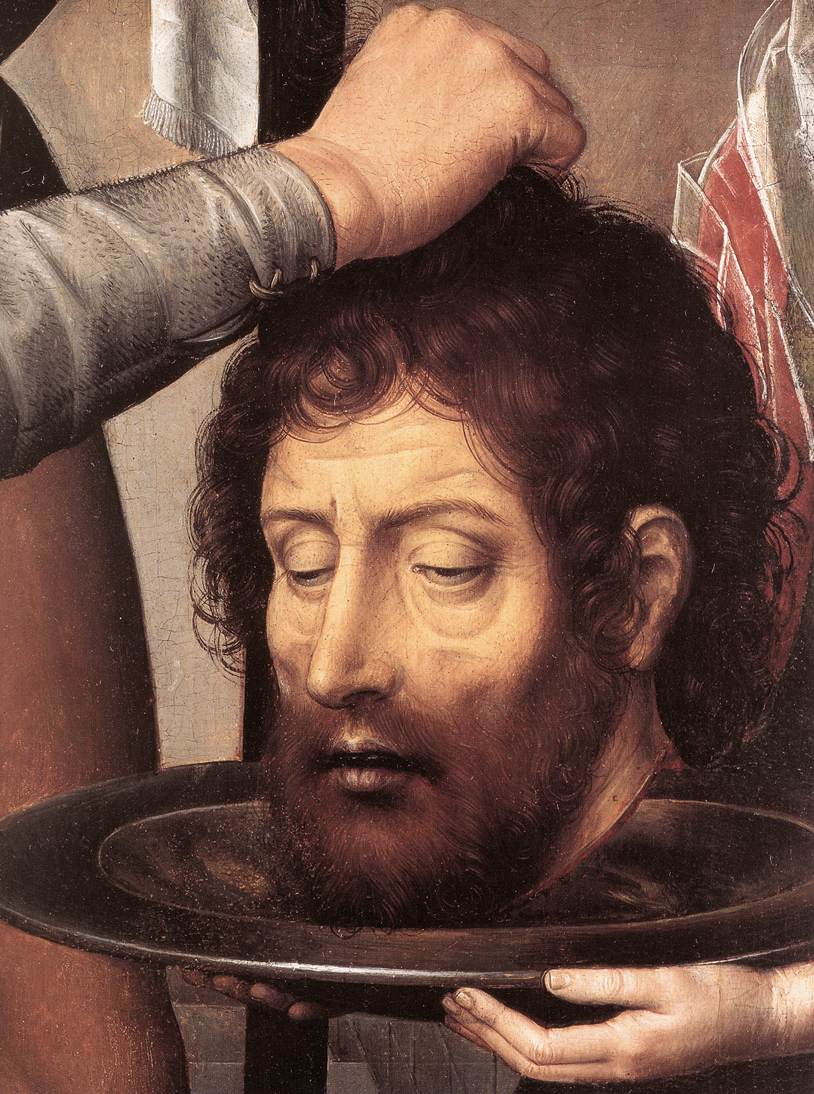
Detail, left panel, John the Baptist's head on a platter

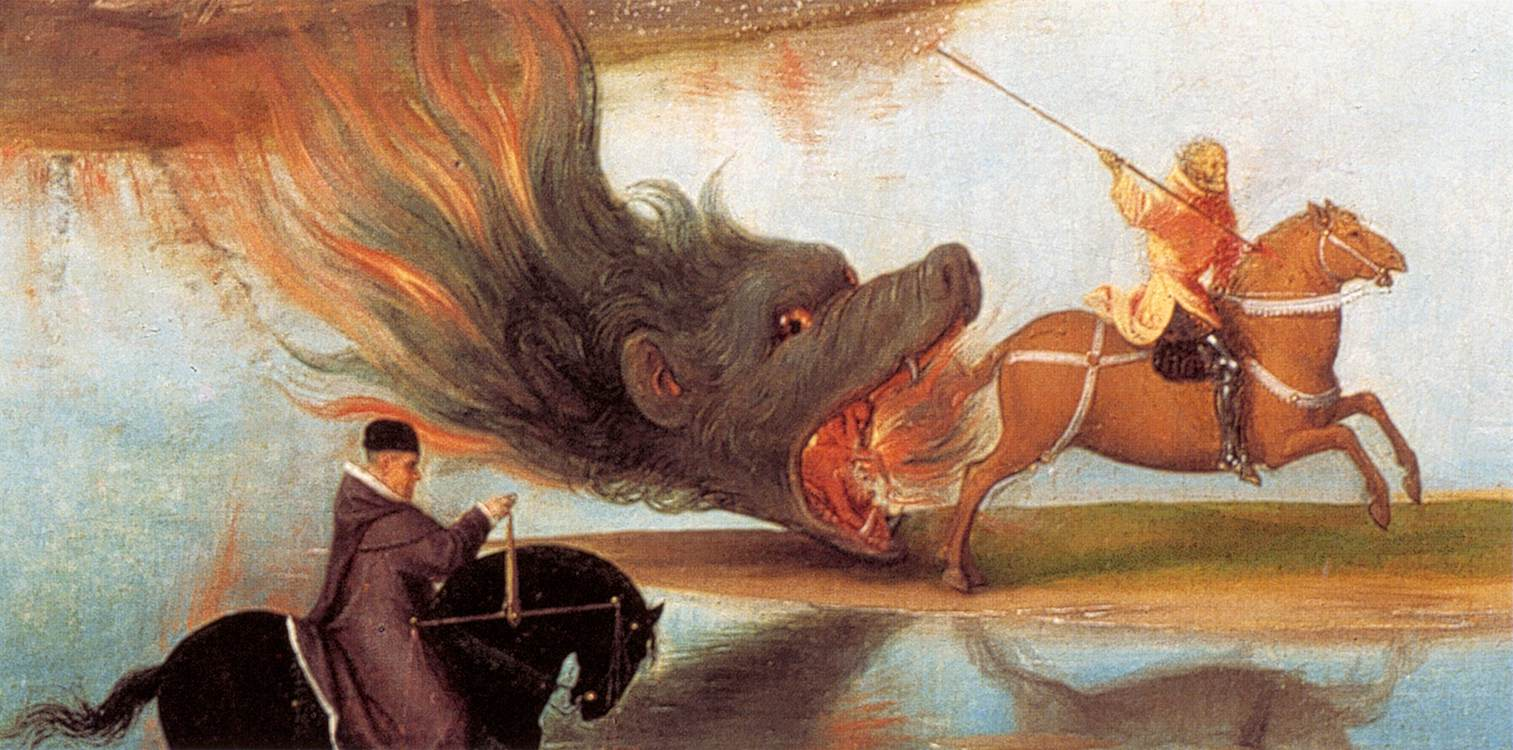
Detail, right panel, two of the Four Horsemen of the Apocalypse, "Famine" on a black horse (carrying a scale) and "Death" entering from the fiery mouth of hell

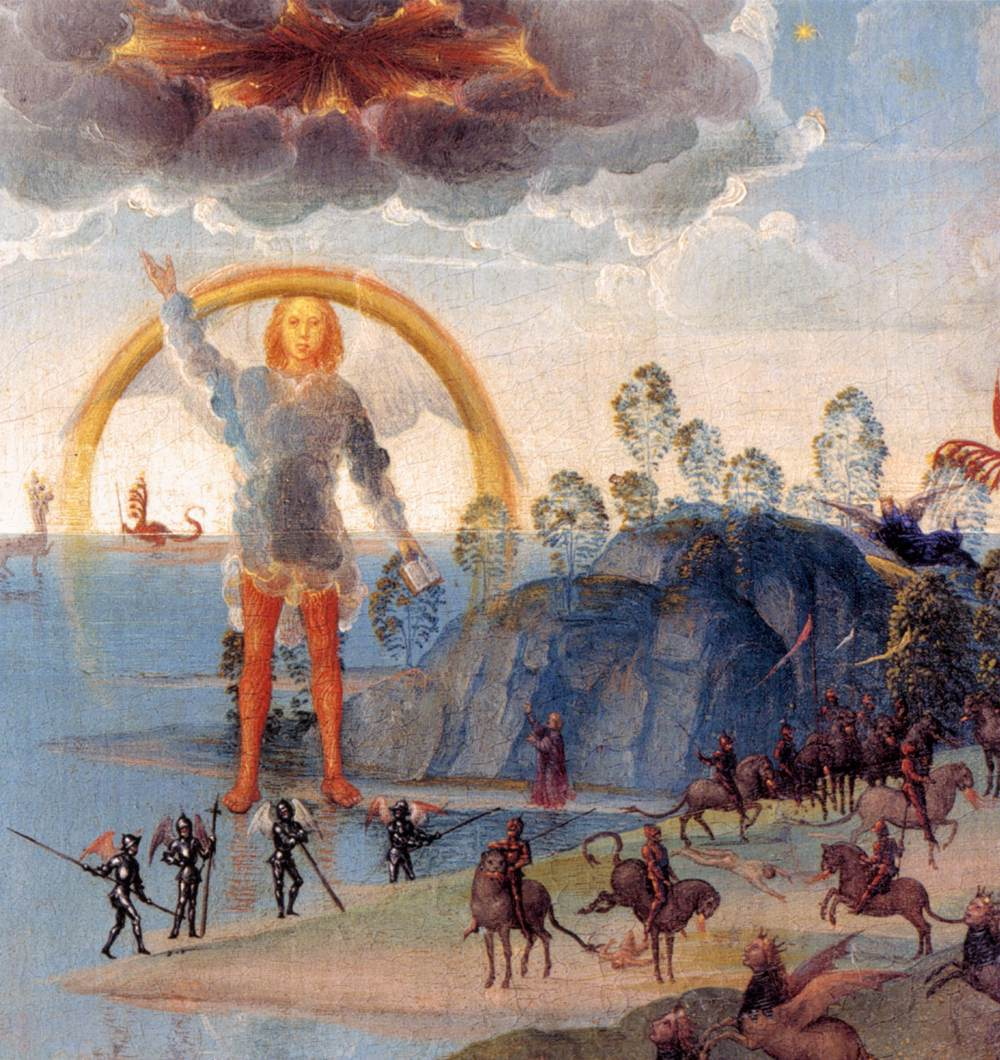
Detail right panel, a giant angel rises from the sea and on land armored angels battle mounted locusts

=== Adaptations ===
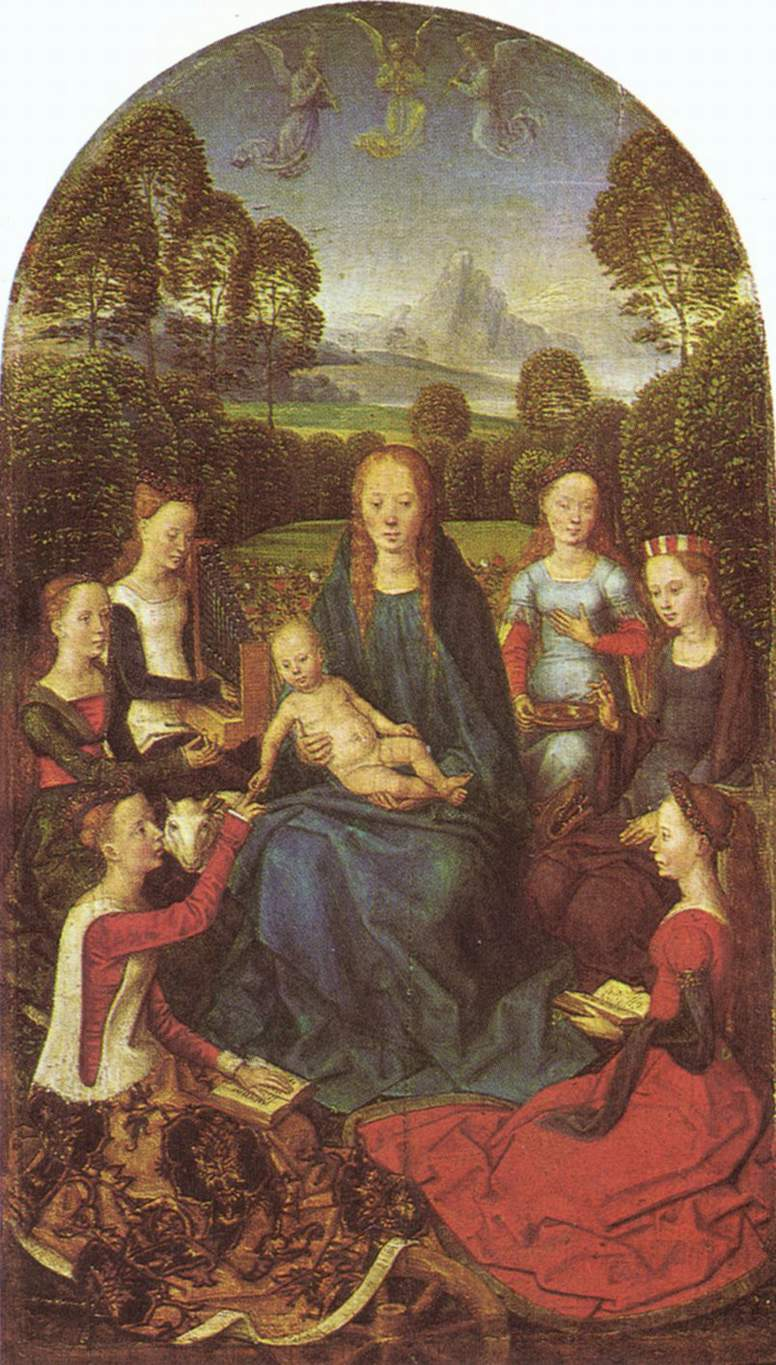
Memling. Mary with virgin saints on the right panel of the Diptych of Jean Cellier c. late 1470s

Detail showing the crown held by completely blue seraphim from Virgin and Child Enthroned with two Musical Angels c. 1465 – 1467

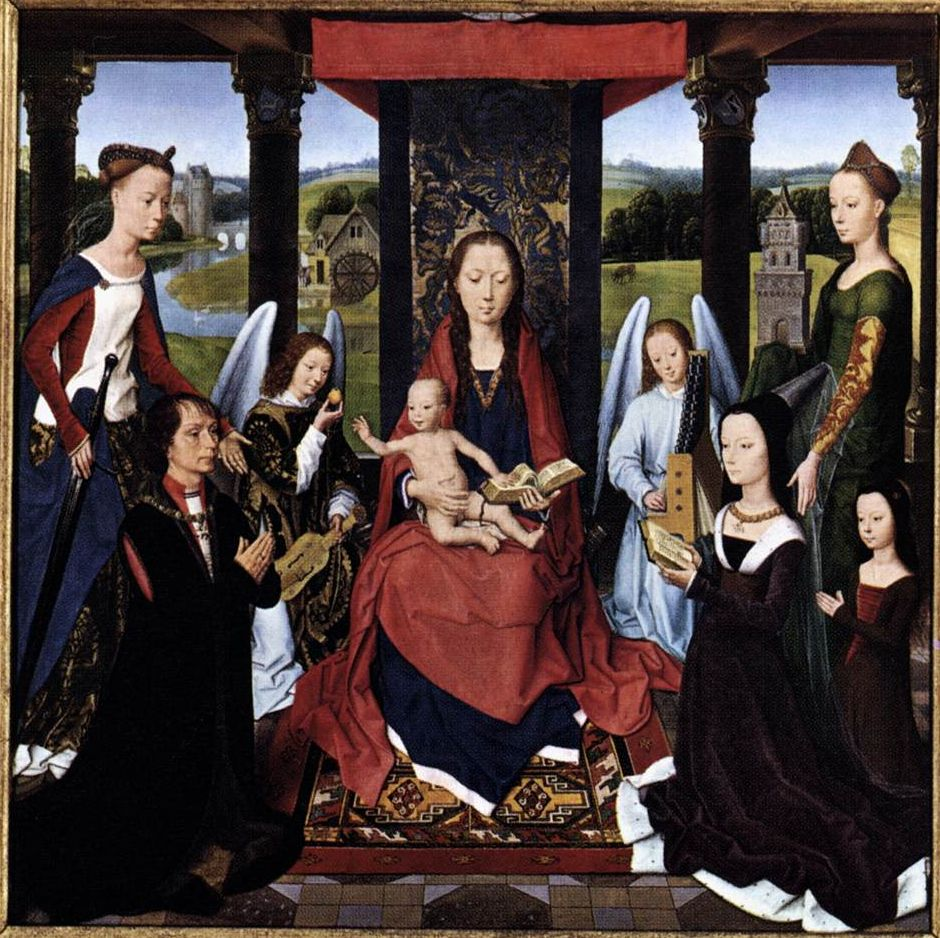
The central panel of the Donne Triptych (c. 1480) shows many of the same motifs found in the altarpiece
