= Mystic Marriage of St. Catherine (Memling) =

Painting by Hans Memling

- Virgin and Child with Saints Catherine of Alexandria and Barbara
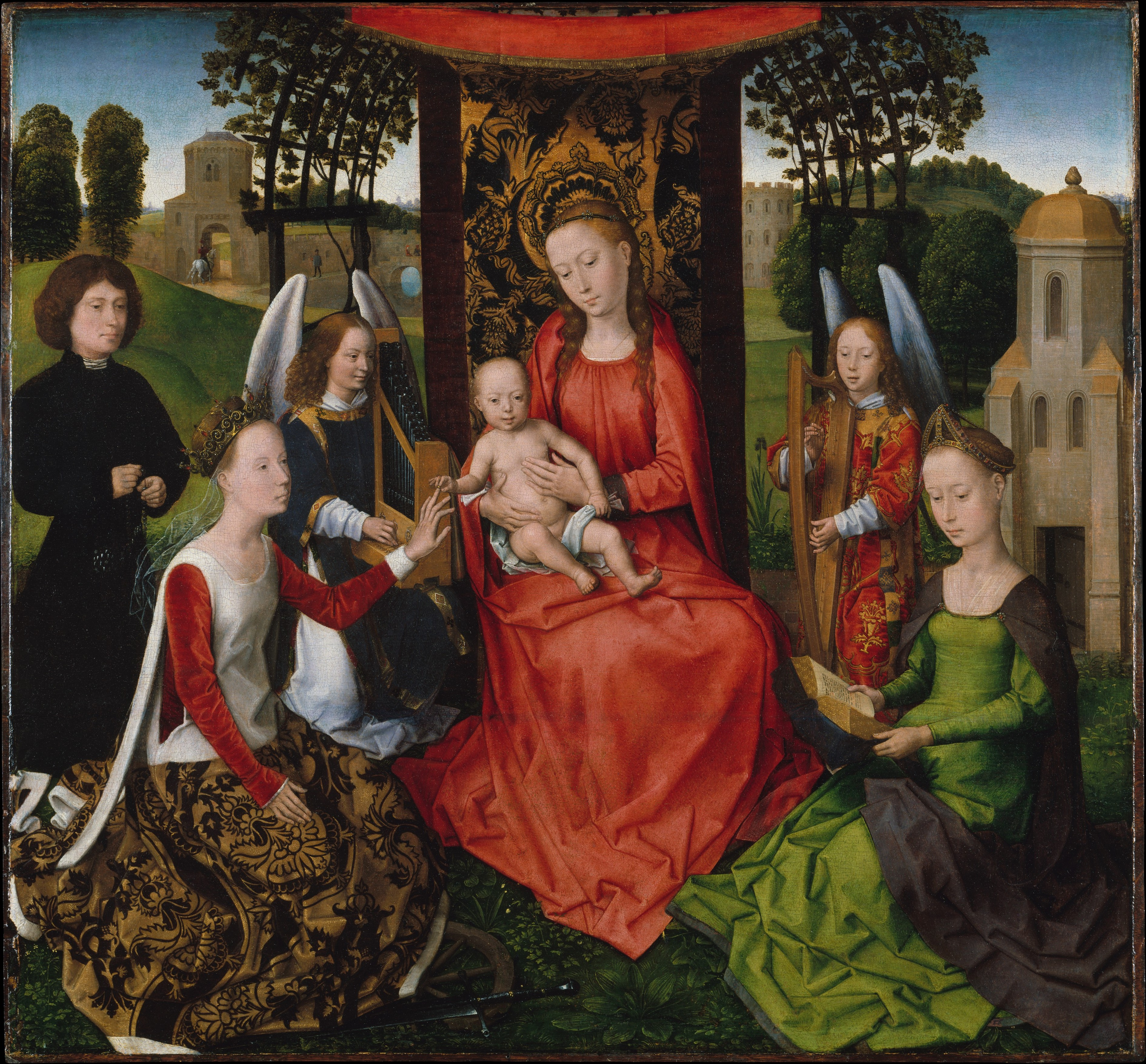
- Artist: Hans Memling
- Year: early 1480s
- Medium: Oil on wood panel
- Dimensions: 67 cm × 72.1 cm (26 in × 28.4 in)
- Location: Metropolitan Museum of Art, New York
- Website: Mystic Marriage of St. Catherine

The Mystic Marriage of St. Catherine (or Virgin and Child with Saints Catherine of Alexandria and Barbara) is a c. 1480 oil-on-oak painting by the Early Netherlandish painter Hans Memling, now in the Metropolitan Museum of Art, New York. The Virgin Mary sits on a throne in a garden holding the Child Jesus in her lap. Mother and child are flanked by angels playing musical instruments, with St Catherine of Alexandria to the left opposite St Barbara on the right. The male figure standing slightly behind the celestial group presumably commissioned the painting as a devotional donor portrait.

The exterior landscape setting combines elements of a hortus conclusus (enclosed garden), sacred conversation (sacred conversation) and Virgo inter Virgines; the latter always presents Mary with female saints. Its visual harmony, structure, and color reflect Memling's characteristically serene style, synthesizing techniques and elements of Jan van Eyck's and Rogier van der Weyden's works.

The composition is almost an exact replica of the central panel in Memling's St John Altarpiece. It is unknown when he painted the Mystic Marriage; 1480 seems a probable date according to tree ring analysis. The arbor arching over the Virgin's throne was added at a later date, possibly in the 16th century.

== Description ==
Saints and angels flank the Virgin and Child with the donor kneeling to the left of the holy figures. Mary sits on her throne beneath a rich brocade canopy of honor, holding the child Jesus on her lap. Two angels dressed in liturgical garments, stand to either side of the throne slightly behind the two saints. The angel to the left plays a portable organ; the one on the opposite side has a harp. The martyr virgin saint, St Catherine of Alexandria kneels in front of Mary to the left; opposite is St Barbara reading a missal. The features of the female faces show Memling's development, according to Ainsworth, who writes that by this period he had "settled on a certain successful female type" of a graceful oval face, wide eyes and narrow chins, and expressions reflecting "a state of gentle, beatific acceptance."

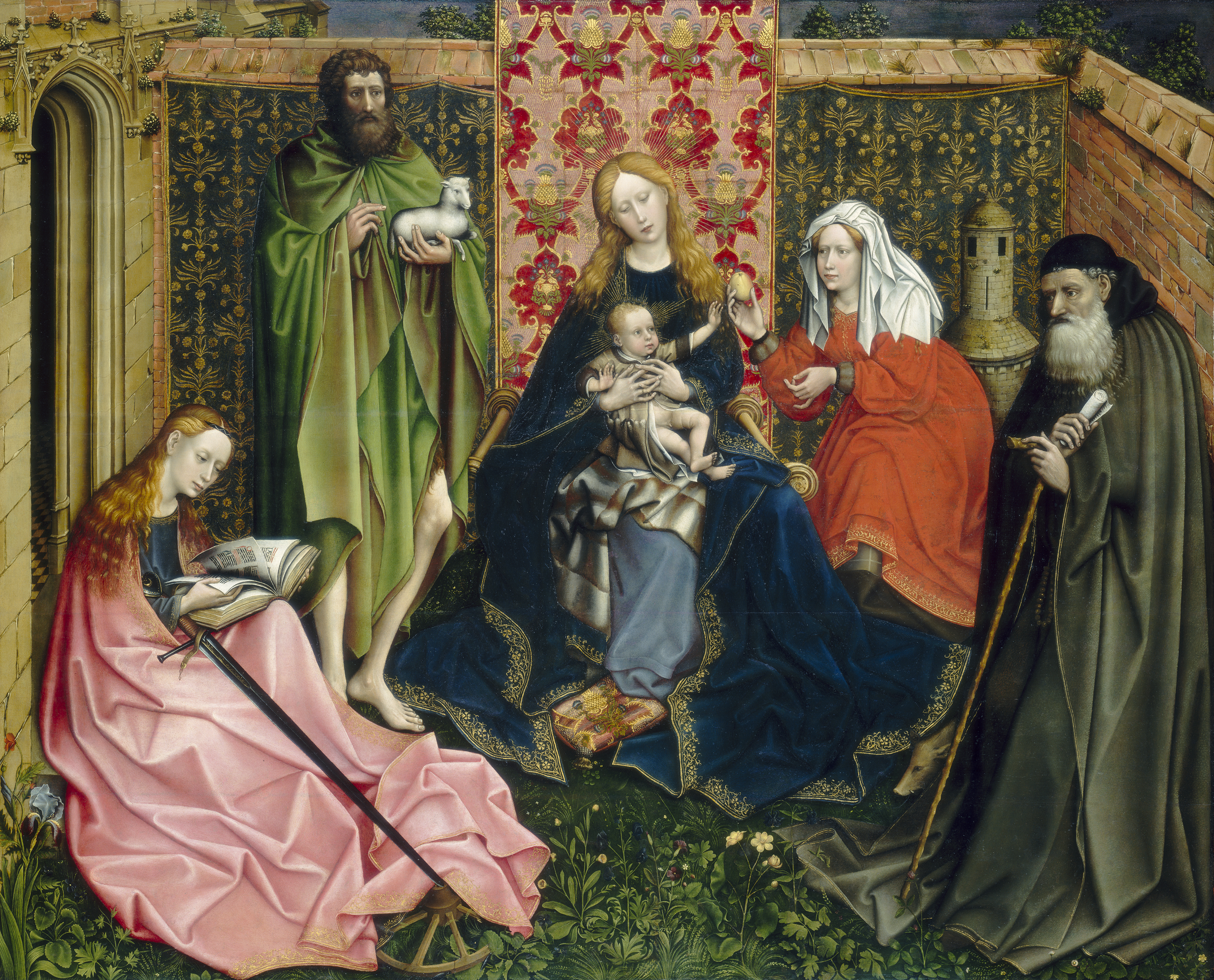
Robert Campin, Virgin and Child with Saints in an Enclosed Garden, c. late 14th century – early 15th century

St Catherine was highly venerated in the Middle Ages, second only in popularity to the Magdelen. Emperor Maxentius tortured Catherine on an iron-spiked wheel and later, when she proclaimed herself married to Christ, cut off her head. According to her legend the mystic marriage occurred in a dream from which she awoke with a ring on her finger. Her emblems are the breaking wheel and sword, seen in the foreground, peeking out from beneath the voluminous folds of her ermine-lined skirt. To denote her royal birth, Catherine wears a crown on her head and is dressed in rich clothing – a white tabard, red velvet sleeves, and a richly patterned brocade skirt. She extends her left hand to the Christ Child who places the ring on her finger, symbolizing their spiritual or mystical betrothal. James Snyder writes that typical of Memling's art, "the drama of the moment is in no way reflected by the expressions on the faces of the participants."

St Barbara, sits across from Catherine, in front of her emblem, the tower where her father had her imprisoned and where she was secretly baptized. It is shaped of a monstrance for the sacramental bread; its three windows symbolize the Trinity. In 1910 James Weale identified Catherine as probably an early portrait of Mary of Burgundy and Barbara as the earliest likeness of Margaret of York, which medieval art historian Thomas Kren thinks is plausible. Both women belonged to the Guild of St Barbara at Ghent; Margaret of York was an avid bibliophile who commissioned a number of illuminated manuscripts, one of which was a Life of St Catherine.

The donor kneels behind St Catherine holding a set of rosary beads in his hands. Attached to his hip, only partially visible, is either a small purse or a coat-of-arms.

== Iconography ==
Master of the Virgo inter Virgines, Virgin and Child with female martyr saints, c. late 1480s

A common Marian presentation in Late Gothic art was the hortus conclusus, depicting the Virgin and Child in an enclosed garden. Memling extends the theme by positioning the group against an open sweeping background landscape. Mary's emblem the iris is visible in the garden behind her throne. The enclosed garden motif symbolizes the Virgin's purity, as evoked in the Song of Songs.

The painting also contains elements of a sacra conversazione and the more specific Virgo inter Virgines. In a sacra conversazione, Virgin and Child are grouped with saints and donors, whereas a Virgo inter Virgines presents the Virgin and Child only with virgin martyr saints and more often without the donor. The latter gained popularity in the Low Countries during the late 15th century; the setting was almost always in an enclosed garden, the grouping always included Virgin and Child with Saints Catherine and Barbara. Frequently St Catherine's mystical marriage is depicted. Depending on the wishes of the donor or the purpose of a work, other virgin saints such as Dorothy or Cecilia were added to the grouping. Paula Pumplin writes the subgenre might have originated with Hugo van der Goes or with Memling.

The grape arbor arching over the canopy is a later addition, perhaps requested by the donor or a subsequent owner. Technical examination reveals significant differences between Memling's style and the hand that executed the arbor: the green pigments differ from the pigments used for the green background landscape; and the brushstrokes "are broader and more descriptive of nature than are the schematic strokes that characterize the stylized trees and bushes of the background landscape". The grape arbor is absent from the extensive underdrawings. An early 16th century copy of the painting at the Galleria dell'Accademia in Florence contains a similar motif, suggesting the arbor was added either during Memling's lifetime or so soon after he died. The arbor's paint is similar in age to the painting's original paint layer, adding credence to the theory it was probably added soon after its execution, probably at the request of the donor. It was not unusual for owners to request alterations to a paintings, often to keep them up-to-date. The iconography of the grape arbor was at that time a common means to signify the blood of Christ, particularly significant in Memling's city of Bruges where the Basilica of the Holy Blood was thought to house a relic of Christ's blood.

Such 15th-century paintings were typically devotional pieces, commissioned by donors seeking spiritual salvation after death. Art historian Guy Bauman considers Virgin and Child with Canon van der Paele (1434–36) by Jan van Eyck (1434–36) the most evocative and realistic of these. He writes van Eyck perfectly captures an "encounter [of] mortal and divine beings in another world". The function of Memling's Mystic Marriage is unknown; other than the prayer beads held in the donor's hand, which signify his devotion to the cult of the Virgin, nothing is known about him. Bauman speculates the work could have been an epigraph, or a commemorative piece, because Memling's positioning of the donor behind the saints bears a slight similarity to van Eyck's Canon van der Paele.

== Style and composition ==
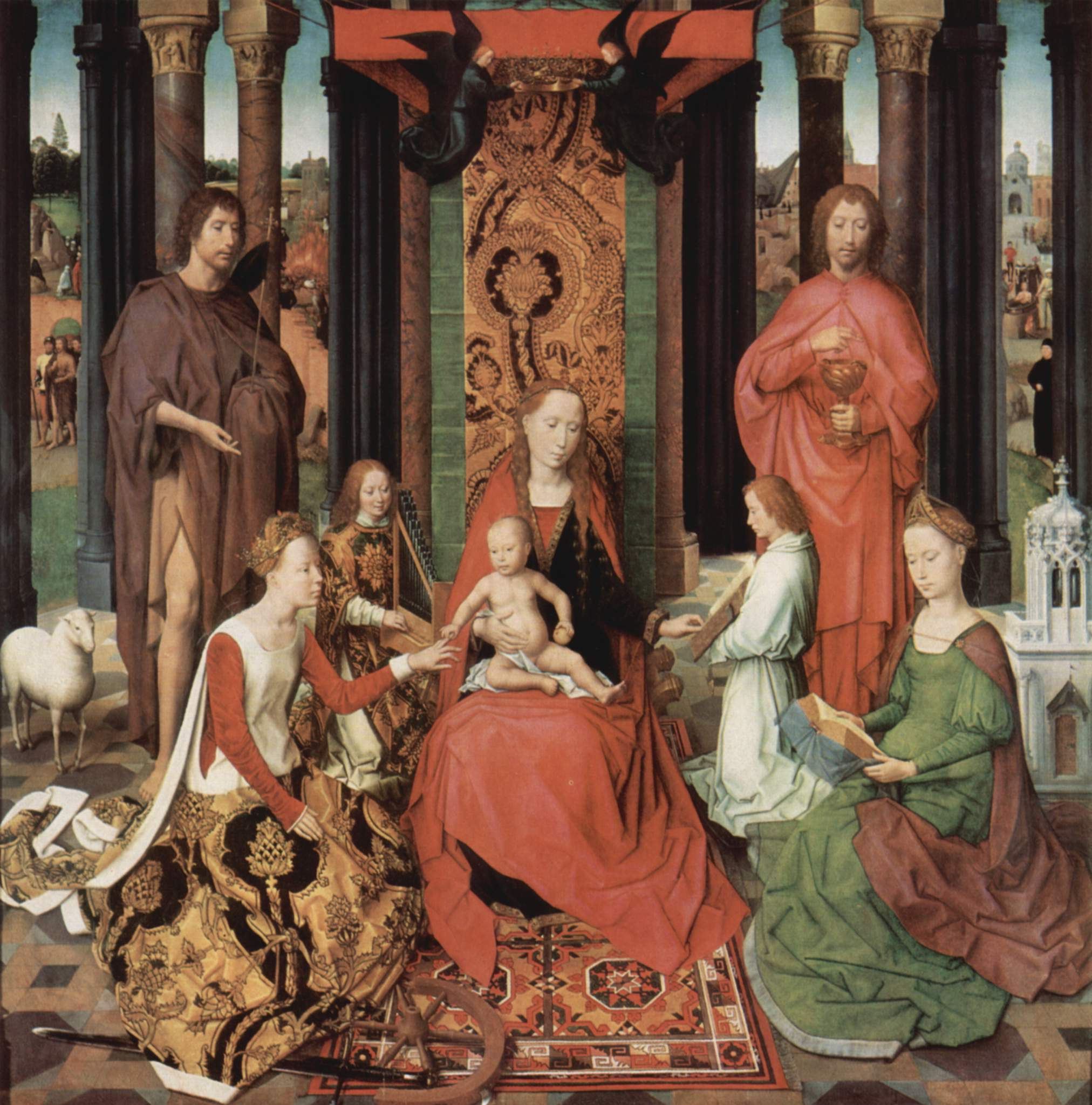
Center panel, St John Altarpiece

Memling was almost certainly apprenticed to Rogier van der Weyden whose style influenced the younger painter. By the end of the 1460s Memling's style was developed; according to Max Friedländer he is best characterized as "an assured pictorial interpreter of quiet mood, at his best when presenting the Virgin in a circle of female saints or as a portraitist." He is known for a style that captures a sense of serenity and grace, which garnered a great amount of admiration during the late-19th century, when he was thought to be was thought to be a painter who saw with his soul. In the early-20th century, however, he was criticized as lacking innovation. Bernhard Ridderbros writes that neither analysis credits Memling "with the significance of his work, which was considerable", nor credits the extent to which he synthesized the techniques and motifs of his predecessors, van der Weyden and van Eyck.

The composition of the Mystic Marriage of St Catherine is almost identical to the central panel of Memling's St John Altarpiece, except that the former is set in a columned space. According to Ainsworth, aside from differences in the folds of the saints' dresses the figures are "virtually identical in type, costume and gesture". The altarpiece has the two St Johns flanking the heavenly figures, whereas here the single donor is shown to the left of St Catherine. Guy Bauman suggests the donor's presence on the left is intrusive, writing that Memling's proclivity for symmetry "has resulted in a curious compositional solution that balances the donor with Saint Barbara's tower".

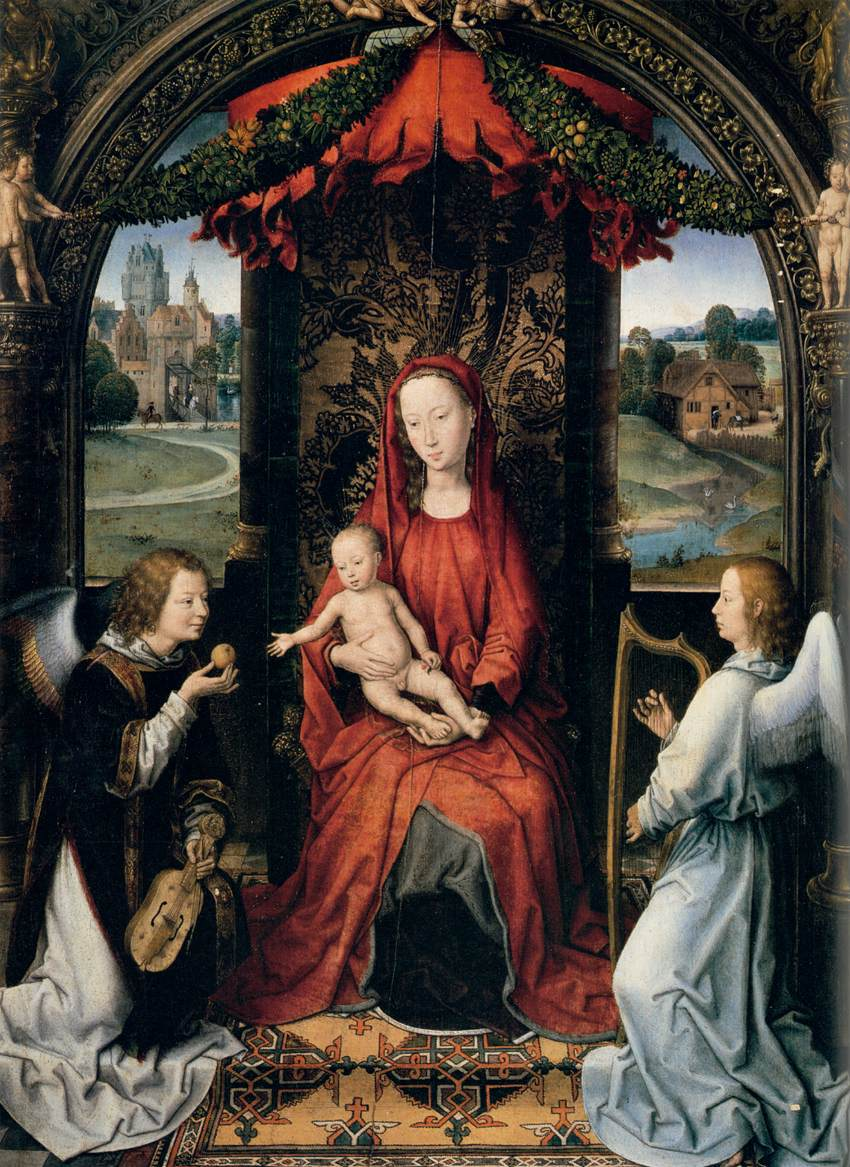
Madonna Enthroned with Child and Two Angels, c. 1480, center panel of the Pagagnotti Triptych

Ainsworth explains the panel "reveals spontaneous and rather detailed underdrawing", which is typical for Memling. She speculates he used preliminary workshop studies as a basis for this panel and other similar renditions of the same scene. The nature of the black chalk underdrawings, visible via technical analyses, suggests he drew them freely before applying layers of paint to achieve a smooth surface. Almost certainly the two paintings, despite their similarities, were not the product of a template or other mechanical means of copying.

Memling was unique in repeating his work; according to Shirley Blum he "duplicated scenes and motifs to an extent never before witnessed in Netherlandish painting." She writes he failed to achieve a sense of unity across the panels of the St John Altarpiece, which he solved by simplifying imagery and by depicting a single idea on a single panel. Unlike van Eyck, whose overwhelmingly large Madonnas symbolize the church in which they stand, hidden or disguised symbolism is absent in Memling's work. His straightforward and literal details function as nothing other than as ornamentation and background for the Virgin. In his later work, the ornamentation became increasingly elaborate and Italianesque. Friedländer likened him to Fra Angelico in that Memling not so much copied or repeated his work, but rather "he pictured the Madonna as she took form in his imagination, depicting therefore always the same body and the same soul."

== Attribution and provenance ==
Only two of Memling's works are definitively attributed and dated; both are at Old St. John's Hospital (Sint-Janshospitaal). The St John Altarpiece is inscribed with a date of 1479, almost certainly the date it was installed; Triptych of Jan Floreins is inscribed and probably commissioned by a prelate or brother at the hospital. Attributions and dating depend on stylistic analysis, but because Memling repeated compositions such as this, dating is more problematic. Generally art historians agree he executed St. Catherine at about the same time as the altarpiece, probably around 1480. Friedländer first suggested the 1480 date in 1916; a date that since has been substantiated with tree ring analysis.

There is no record of the painting's owners until its purchased by Sir Joshua Reynolds of London, who may have acquired it on a trip to Bruges, or from John Taylor of Ashbourne, who is recorded as an owner. It was bequeathed to a Mrs Davenport in London, who showed it Burlington House. At an unknown date it was acquired by architect G. F. Bodley and later sold to a London art dealer who had it cleaned and passed it to Parisian dealer, Leopold Goldschmidt. He had it exhibited in the 1902 Bruges exposition. Benjamin Altman bought it in 1911 for $200,000 and bequeathed it on his death in 1913 to the Altman Collection at New York's Metropolitan museum.
