= Sir John Donne =

Welsh courtier, diplomat and soldier

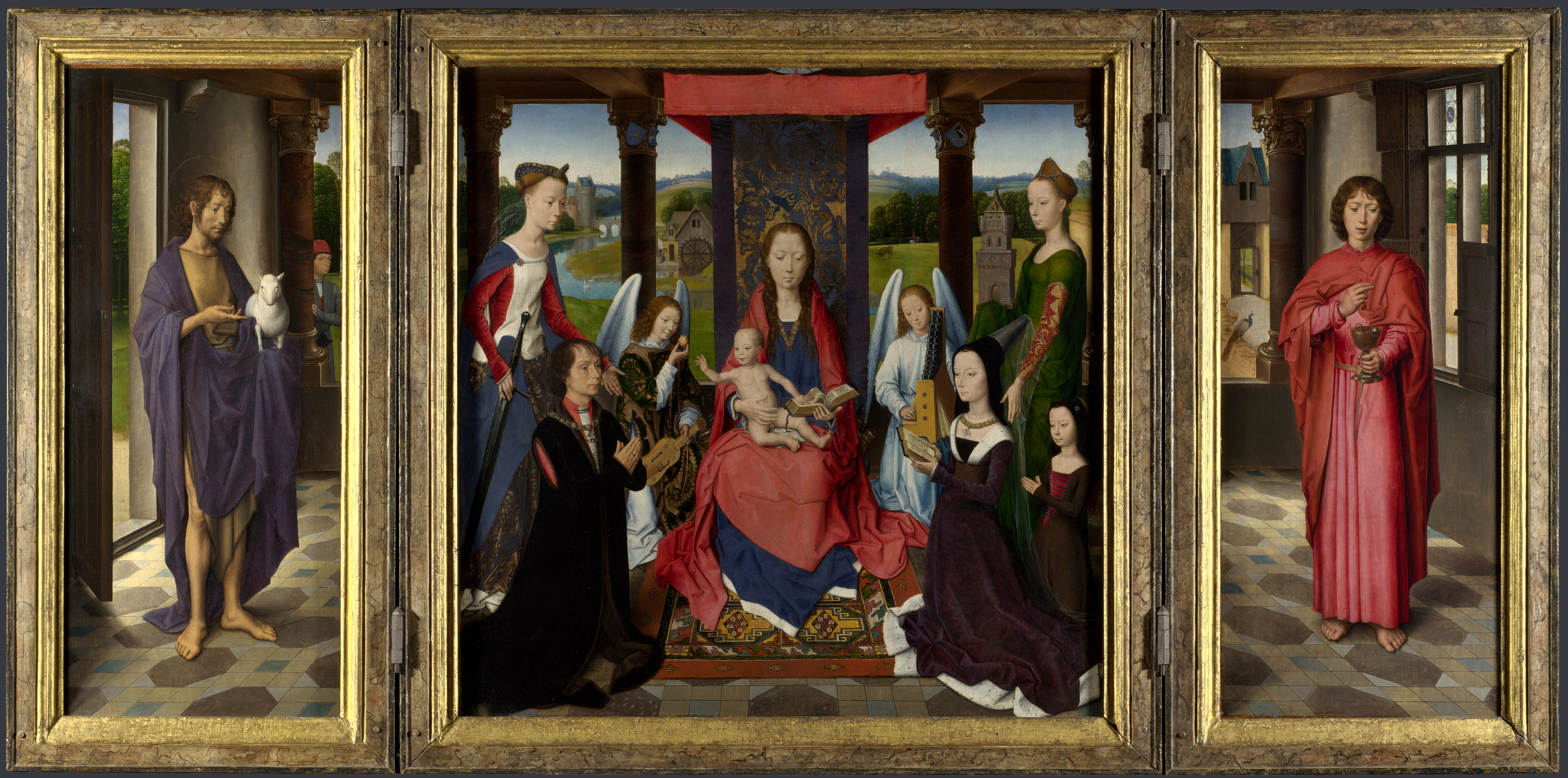
The Donne Triptych by Hans Memling, 1470s, National Gallery, London. Sir John kneels at left, Lady Donne and a daughter at right

Sir John Donne (c.1420s – January 1503) was a Welsh courtier, diplomat and soldier, a notable figure of the Yorkist party. In the 1470s, he commissioned the Donne Triptych, a triptych altarpiece by Hans Memling now in the National Gallery, London. It contains portraits of him, his wife Elizabeth and a daughter. He may well have been related to the Jacobean poet John Donne, although not as a direct ancestor, as he had no Donne grandchildren.

== Family and early career ==
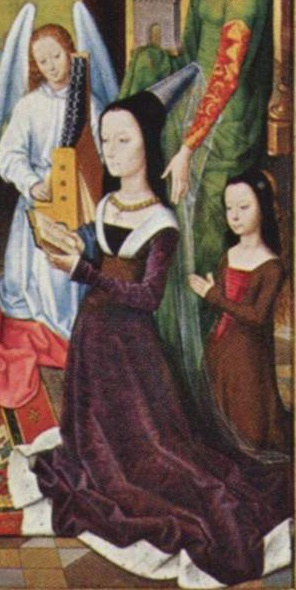
The Donne Triptych by Hans Memling, 1470s, National Gallery, London. Lady Donne and a daughter

The Donnes of Kidwelly, Carmarthenshire, were a distinguished family ("Dwnn" in Welsh). His father Griffith (Gruffydd) reputedly fought at the Battle of Agincourt in 1415 and the Siege of Harfleur and certainly in many other French campaigns and imported wine from Calais to Carmarthen on his own ship ‘ The Le George’; he was Lieutenant of Cherbourg in 1424. His mother was Joan Scudamore, a grandchild of Owain Glyndŵr, the last independent Prince of Wales, who disappeared into hiding in 1412. John Donne was born in France, "in parts of Picardy", probably in the 1420s.

Donne was their third son who entered, probably in his late teens, the service of the Duke of York, father of Edward IV. He may have done so through the patronage of the leading Yorkist in South Wales, William ap Thomas, also an Agincourt veteran and father of Donne's contemporary William Herbert, 1st Earl of Pembroke (1423-1469). Donne is recorded as having fought in France for the Duke, which must have been before 1447. It is from this and his apparent age in the Memling that his birth in the 1420s is estimated. He also fought for the Duke in England, and in the late 1440s in Ireland.

Donne married, before 1465, to Elizabeth Hastings, sister of William, Lord Hastings, the favourite of Edward IV, who was executed by Edward's brother King Richard III of England in 1483. Hastings had also been in the service of the Duke of York for all his adult life, so he and Donne must have known each other very well. The Donnes' surviving children were first two daughters, Anne and Margaret, then two sons Edward and Griffith (both later knighted). Elizabeth Donne died in 1507 or 1508.

On Edward's accession in 1461 he was made an Usher of the Chamber and started to become wealthy. From 1465 to 1469 he was an Esquire of the Body and he was knighted on the field after the huge Yorkist victory of the Battle of Tewkesbury in 1471 (along with many others). His wife was a damicellae or Lady-in-waiting, of the Queen. In the portrait he and his wife wear lavish Yorkist gold collar chains of suns and roses with the personal livery of Edward in pendants of his emblem, a lion, both in white ronde bosse enamel with gold highlights, clutching a ruby in their raised paws. These chains would presumably have been presents from Edward to his close followers.

== Calais and the continent ==
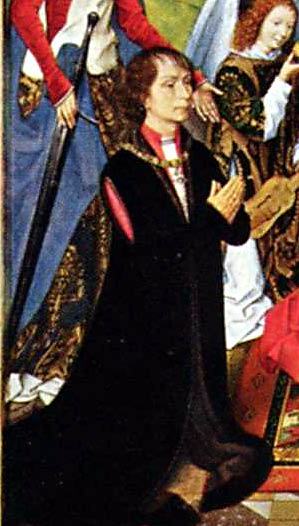
The Donne Triptych by Hans Memling, 1470s, National Gallery, London. Sir John Donne

He was probably the Jehan Don present at the extravagantly celebrated wedding in Bruges in 1468 of Charles the Bold and Margaret of York, sister of Edward IV. He may well have accompanied Edward in his Burgundian exile in 1470–1, as Hastings did. Much later, he was present when the widowed Margaret (his "true friend") met her brother at what is now Syon House in 1480.

In 1468, he is described as "out of Calais", England's outpost in France, and this connection continued for the rest of his career; Hastings was "lieutenant of Calais" or governor, and his brother-in-law Donne his deputy. He owned a house there, and was a member of the Calais council in 1471, involved in negotiations in 1472, and recorded as there in 1475 and several later years. By 1483, he was Deputy of the Tower of Risban, an outlying fort, and before 1497 Lieutenant of the Castle. It may well have been his main base for much of his career; it remained under Yorkist control throughout Edward IV's exile.

The Donne Triptych by Hans Memling would presumably have been made in Bruges, and is believed to date from the 1470s. Many sources still date it to 1468, because they were only aware of Donne's visit to Bruges for the wedding in that year, and because when the donor was first identified as Donne in 1840, the writer (J. G. Nichols) wrongly stated that he was killed in the Battle of Edgcote in 1469.

The National Gallery now favours a date in the late 1470s, perhaps 1478, the date on a later copy, which is plausible, and may have been on the lost original frame. The Donne coat of arms appears on small escutcheons in the capital of the column behind Sir John, rather roughly represented, and impaled with that of Hastings on the capital behind Lady Donne. The Donne arms also appear in a glass roundel in the window in the right side panel.

The portrait of Lady Donne was first painted with a younger, more generalized face, then overpainted, also by Memling, with the present thinner face. This may suggest Memling only saw her when the painting was well underway, and changed his picture to her actual features.

== Illuminated manuscripts ==
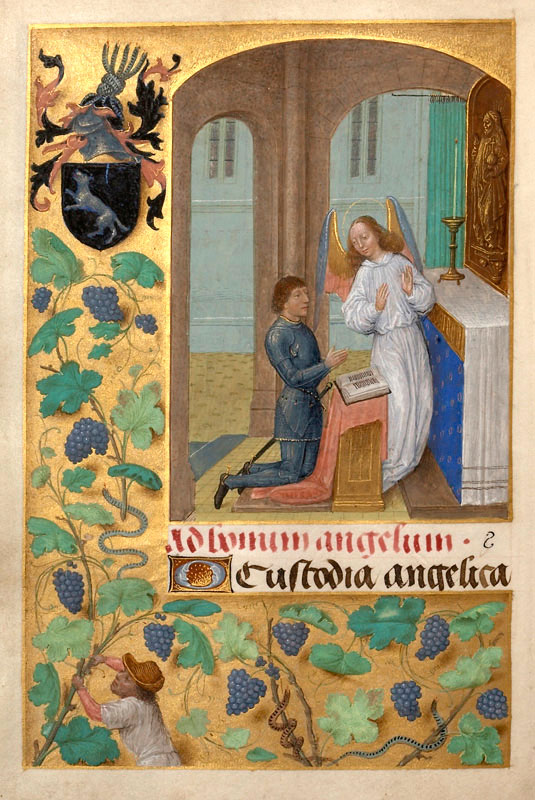
Donne depicted with his coat of arms in the "Louthe Hours" (alias "Donne Hours"), painted by Simon Marmion c.1480, Collection of University of Louvain-la-Neuve, MS A2, f.100v

Apart from the Memling, there are two surviving Flemish illuminated manuscripts commissioned by Donne in the British Library, plus a second-hand one (BL MS Royal 15 D iv) that was a gift from the two Duchesses of Burgundy (the widowed Margaret and her stepdaughter Mary) with the inscriptions: "For yet not har that ys on of yor treu frendes Margarete of Yorke" ("Forget not her that is one of your true friends, Margarete of York), and "Prenez moy ajames pour vre bonne amie Marie D. de bourg.ne" ("Take me forever for your good friend, Mary, Duchess of Burgundy"). This was formerly in the Old Royal Library, probably having been presented to Henry VIII by one of Donne's sons. He commissioned an important Book of Hours of about 1480, now known as the "Donne Hours", previously called the "Louthe Hours" due to an incorrect identification of the commissioner of the work, now in Louvain, which has a miniature of him kneeling in armour with his guardian angel with on the same folio a representation of his arms: Azure, a wolf salient argent (as shown on escutcheons on the capitals of the columns in the Donne Triptych by Hans Memling), with crest: A knot of five snakes.

Several of Donne's close associates: Edward, Hastings, the two Duchesses of Burgundy and others, were important patrons of Flemish art in various forms, and there a number of indications that Donne supervised the progress of the triptych carefully, and requested changes.

== Diplomacy ==
His formal diplomatic career seems to have begun in February 1477, when he and John Morton, the future Lord Chancellor and Archbishop of Canterbury, were ambassadors to the French court. In May of the same year, he and two others were ambassadors to the other side, the Imperial ambassadors in Burgundy. He was sent on several such missions, and may have been an important figure in diplomacy with Burgundy. The history of Yorkist diplomacy has not been fully explored, and Donne's position in it is currently hard to assess.

== Later life ==
He acquired estates at Horsenden, Buckinghamshire in 1480, which then became his primary British residence. He managed to avoid getting caught in the fall of Hastings in 1483, and was appointed High Sheriff of Bedfordshire and Buckinghamshire for 1485 under King Richard III. After the change of dynasty in 1485, he must have made an accommodation with his fellow Welshman, Henry VII, at which point he would have reached an age to retire in any case. Both he and his wife are buried in St George's Chapel at Windsor Castle, next to Edward IV and Hastings, which is in itself indicative of royal favour.

His two sons worked for Henry VIII. His descendants include the Earls of Oxford, Cumberland, Burlington, and the Dukes of Devonshire. The Memling passed through these last three families.

== Sources ==
- National Gallery Catalogues: The Fifteenth Century Netherlandish Paintings by Lorne Campbell, 1998, ISBN 1-85709-171-X – unless stated

Political offices
Preceded by Thomas Fowler	High Sheriff of Bedfordshire and Buckinghamshire; 1484–1485	Succeeded by George Ingleton
