= St. Ursula Shrine =

Reliquary by Hans Memling

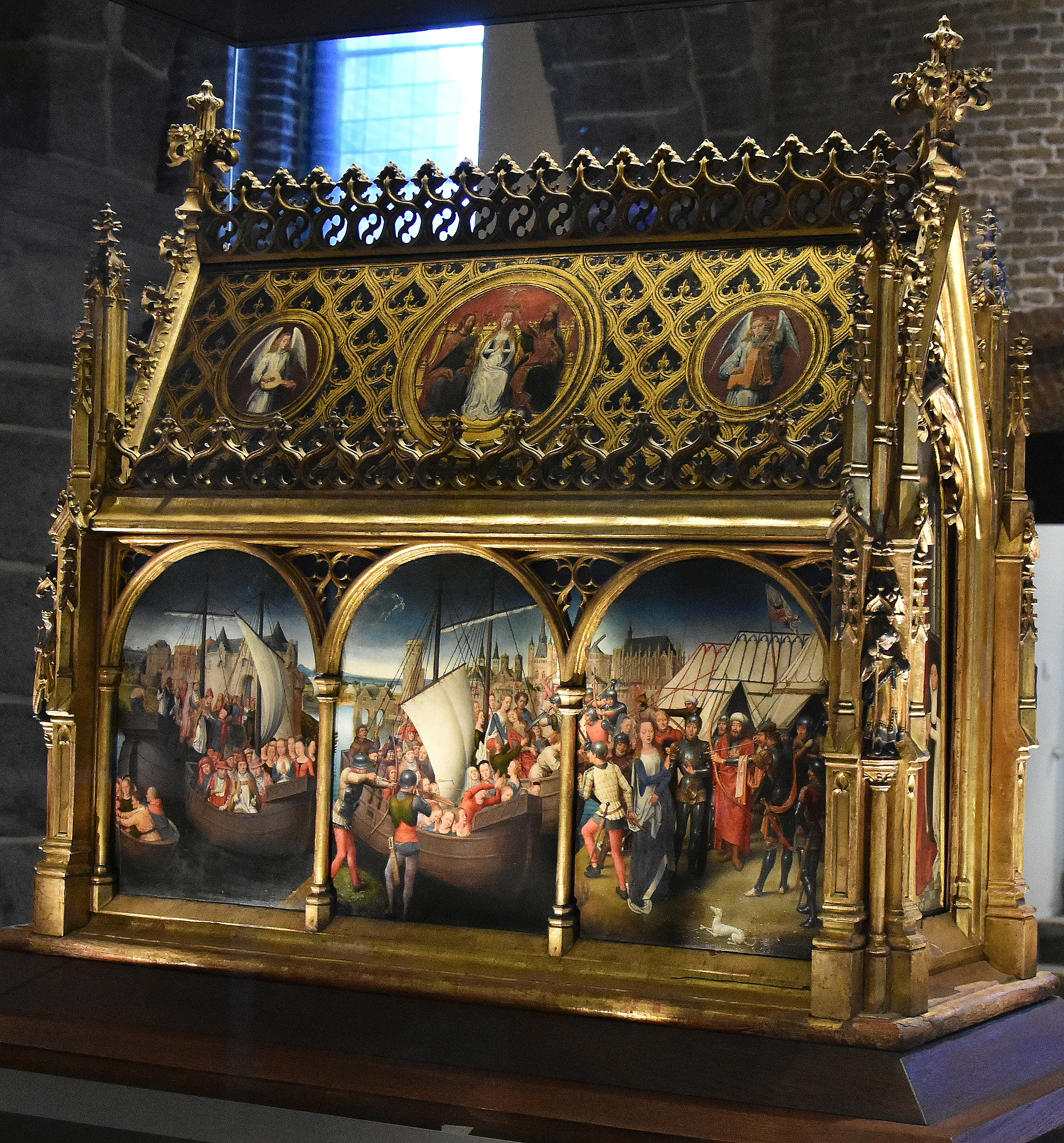
The Shrine of St. Ursula

The Shrine of St. Ursula is a carved and gilded wooden reliquary containing oil on panel inserts (87x33x91 cm) by Hans Memling. Dating to c. 1489, it is in the Hans Memling Museum in the Old St. John's Hospital (Sint-Janshospitaal), Bruges, in the Flemish Region of modern-day Belgium.

The work was commissioned by the Hospital of St. John, the current museum's seat. Differently from other works by Memling, such as the St John Altarpiece or the Jan Floreins Altarpiece, it is neither signed nor dated. It was a container for Saint Ursula's relics which was shown publicly only on her feast day. The relics were solemnly put in the shrine on 21 October 1489.

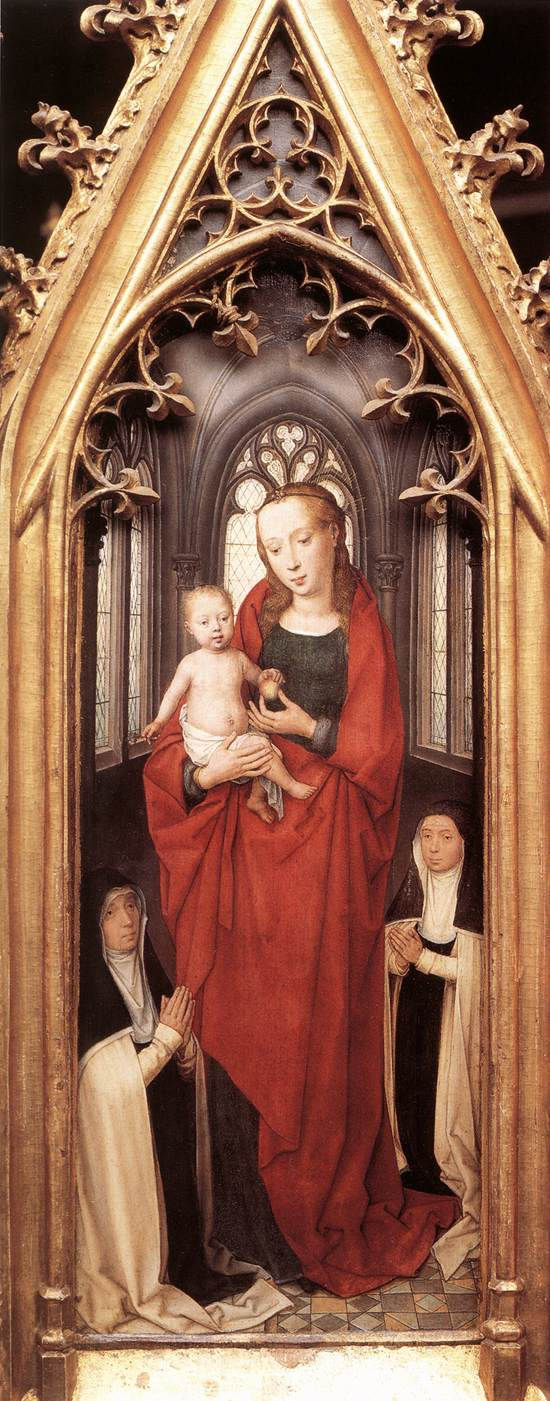
Virgin and Child

== Description ==
The shrine is a chasse in the shape of a Gothic chapel or house, a typical form at the time. It has a steeply pointed cover, as typical of northern European countries, with three painted panels on each side. Attributed to Memling's workshop, they depict, on one side, the First Eleven Virgins with the Pope, a Cardinal, a Bishop and Etherius (characters of the saint's legend); on the other side, the Coronation of the Virgin with the Holy Trinity.

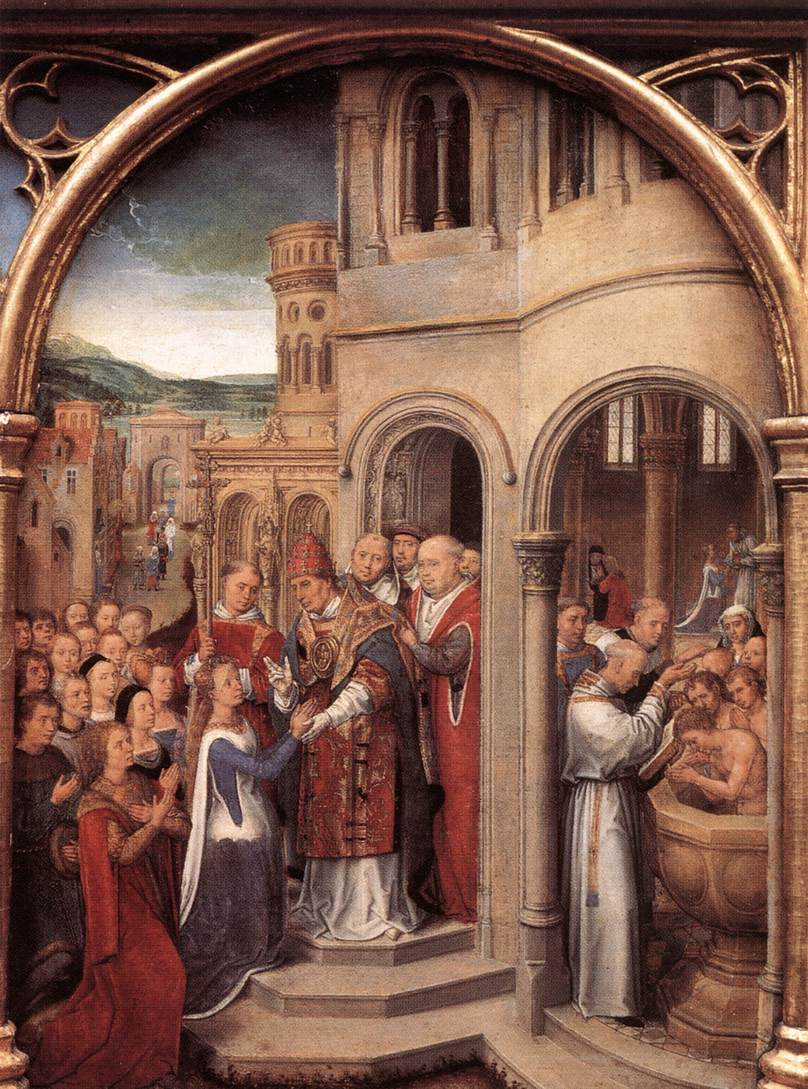
Arrival in Rome

The two "façades" contain the representations of the Virgin and Child between Two Nuns (the two donors, including the abbess), and St. Ursula Protecting the Holy Virgins. Both the scenes are embedded within a painted niche which simulates a perspective interior of the shrine.

At the sides, under two small arcades, are six scenes of the life and martyrdom of St. Ursula, which resemble the style of the stained glasses in contemporary churches. They include:

- Arrival in Cologne
- Arrival in Basel
- Arrival in Rome
- Leaving from Basel
- Martyrdom of the Pilgrims
- Martyrdom of St. Ursula

The scenes share the same pictorial background, set in northern German cities (such as Cologne, with the unfinished Cathedral) and painted with great attention to today's life details.

The decoration is completed by the carvings in International Gothic style, including pinnacles, holed friezes and, on the piers at the corners, the saints James, John the Evangelist, Agnes and Elizabeth of Hungary.

== Sources ==
- Zuffi, Stefano (2004). Il Quattrocento. Milan: Electa. ISBN 88-370-2315-4.
