= Adoration of the Magi (Memling) =

Painting by Hans Memling

The Adoration of the Magi
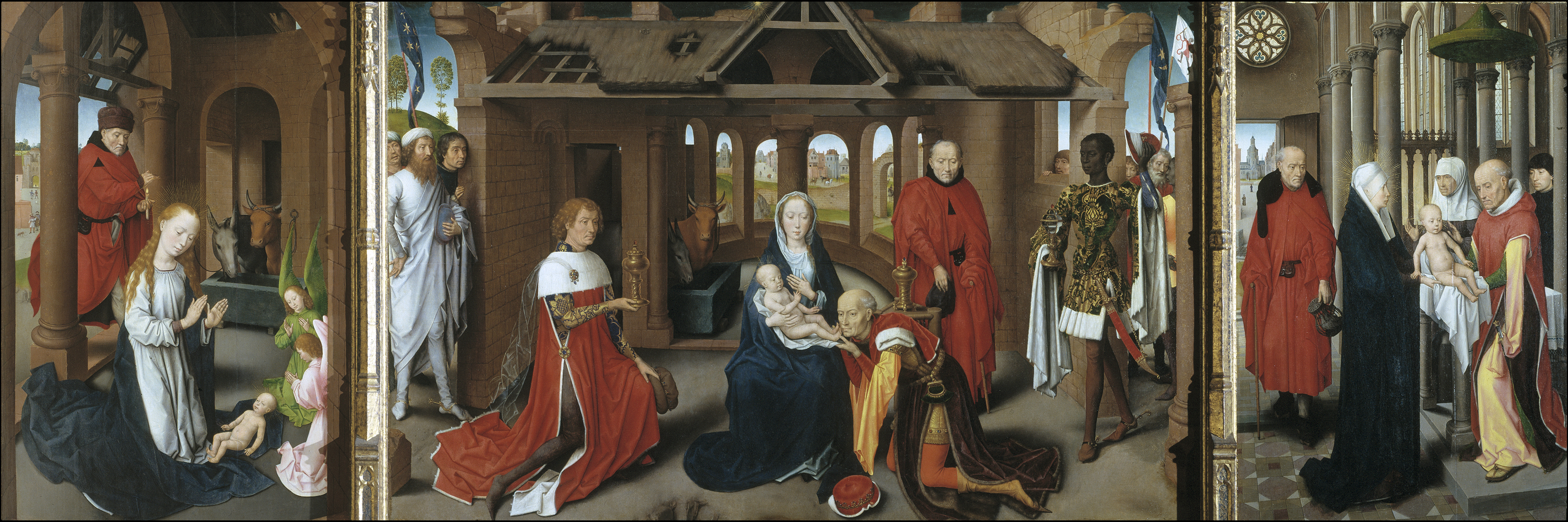
- Artist: Hans Memling
- Year: c. 1479-80
- Medium: oil on panel
- Location: Museo del Prado, Madrid

The Adoration of the Magi is an oil on panel triptych by Hans Memling, painted in 1479–1480, though Max Jakob Friedländer places it in 1470. It is now in the Prado Museum in Madrid, which acquired it in 1847. It is also known as the Prado Triptych.

Its central panel measures 147.5 cm by 96 cm. The central scene shows the Adoration of the Magi, flanked by panels of the Nativity and the Presentation of Christ in the Temple. Its choice and treatment of themes links it to the c. 1455 Saint Columba Altarpiece, the 1479 Jan Floreins Altarpiece and the c.1462 Hulin de Loo Altarpiece.
