= Diptych of Maarten van Nieuwenhove =

Painting by Hans Memling

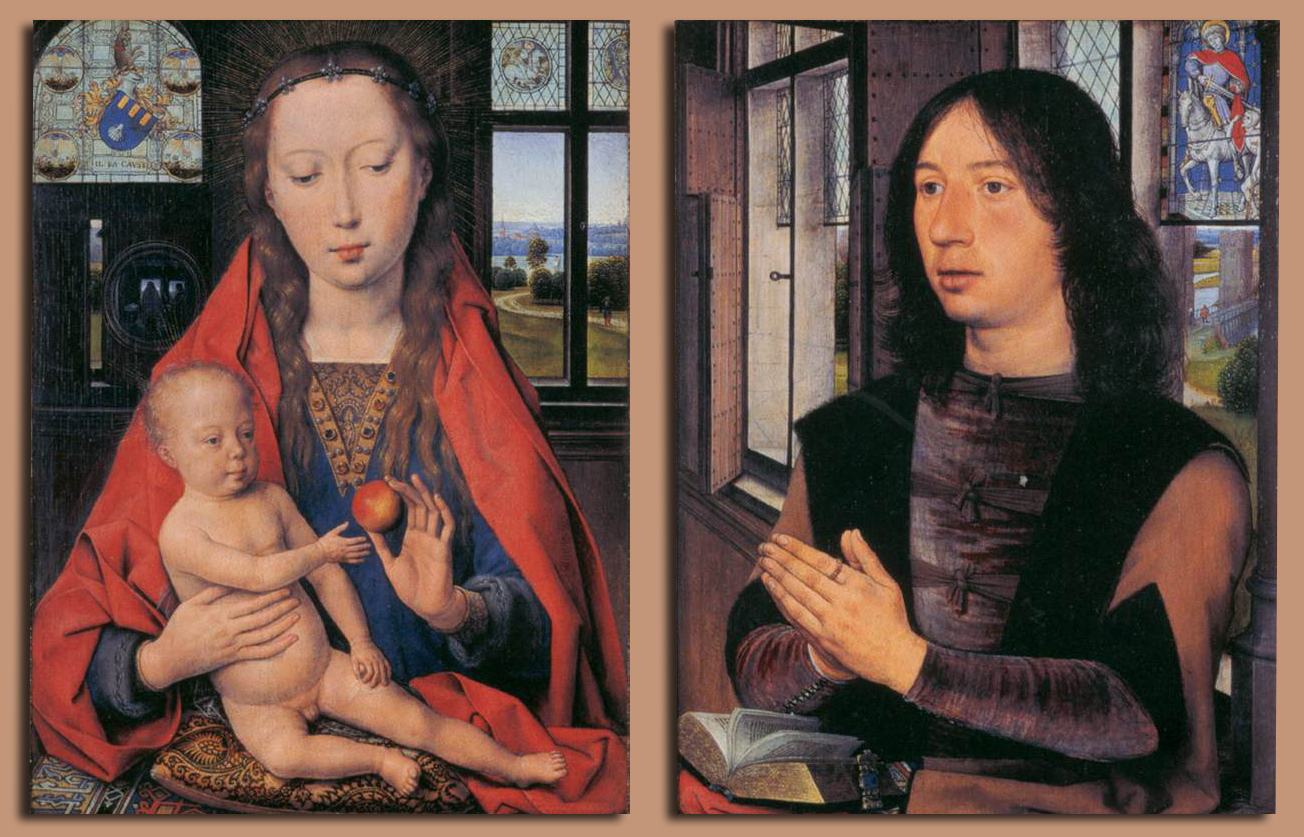
- Artist: Hans Memling
- Year: 1487
- Medium: Oil on panel
- Dimensions: 33.5 by 44.7 centimetres (13.2 in × 17.6 in) (each panel); 41.5 by 52.5 centimetres (16.3 in × 20.7 in) (each panel including the frame)
- Location: Old St. John's Hospital, Bruges

The Diptych of Maarten van Nieuwenhove is a 1487 painting by Hans Memling, showing on the left side the Virgin and Child, and on the right side Maarten van Nieuwenhove. It is now kept in the Old St. John's Hospital in Bruges. It is unsigned, but has invariably been attributed to Hans Memling since the middle of the 19th century.

== Description ==
The painting is an early example of an Early Netherlandish devotional diptych, which still preserves the original frame and hinges. A new invention was showing the scene in a continuous room, instead of against a monochrome background.

The window at the upper left originally was clear glass, showing a landscape. The composition was changed at a later stage to show the coat of arms of Van Nieuwenhove here instead. It was more common to have this on the outer panels than this prominently. It is surrounded by four images of a hand sowing seeds, a pun on the name of the donor which means "from the new garden". The same coat of arms can also be seen on the clasp of the book in front of Van Nieuwenhove.

The mirror behind Mary shows the scene in reverse, making it even more explicit that the two panels are placed in the same room and time, even though the actual configuration seen in the mirror does not match the scene in the main painting. Memling only included the mirror in a later stage of the composition. This unity of space was also emphasized by small details like the carpet to the left of Mary, which reappears beneath the hands of van Nieuwenhove. The work was probably intended to be displayed with the two panels at an angle, but it is uncertain how exactly they should be placed. One possibility is that it was intended to be hung from a wall or column, with the Virgin panel fixed and the van Nieuwenhove panel loose.

The inscription at the bottom of the two panels reads "HOC OPUS FIERI FECIT MARTINUS DE NEWENHOVEN ANNO DM 1487 - ANO VERO ETATIS SUE 23" meaning "Maarten van Nieuwenhove had this work made in 1487" (left panel) and "At the age of 23" (right panel).

The glass panels in the windows depict Saint Christopher and Saint George (above the Virgin and Child) and Saint Martin of Tours (as his namesake saint) above Maarten van Nieuwenhove. Through the open window, one can see the Minnewater, also (mistakenly) known as the "Lake of Love" ('minne' being the Medieval term for 'love' in Dutch), a romantic corner of Bruges.

== The donor ==
Maarten van Nieuwenhove (11 November 1463 - 16 August 1500) came from a noble family of Bruges with connections at the court of Burgundy. In the 1490s, Van Nieuwenhove was successively a city councilor, the captain of the civic guard, and in 1498 mayor of Bruges.

== Provenance ==
- Ordered by Maarten van Nieuwenhove in 1487.
- Bruges, Saint Julian Hospital.
- Owned by the Old St. John's Hospital since 1815. This was turned into a museum in 1839.

== Gallery ==
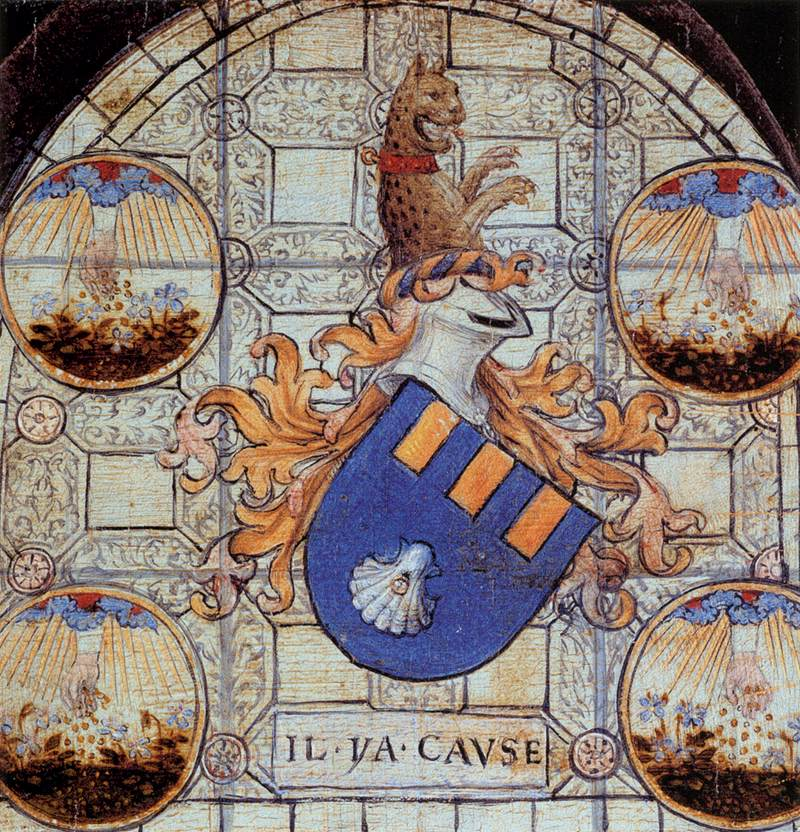
Coat of arms of Van Nieuwenhove

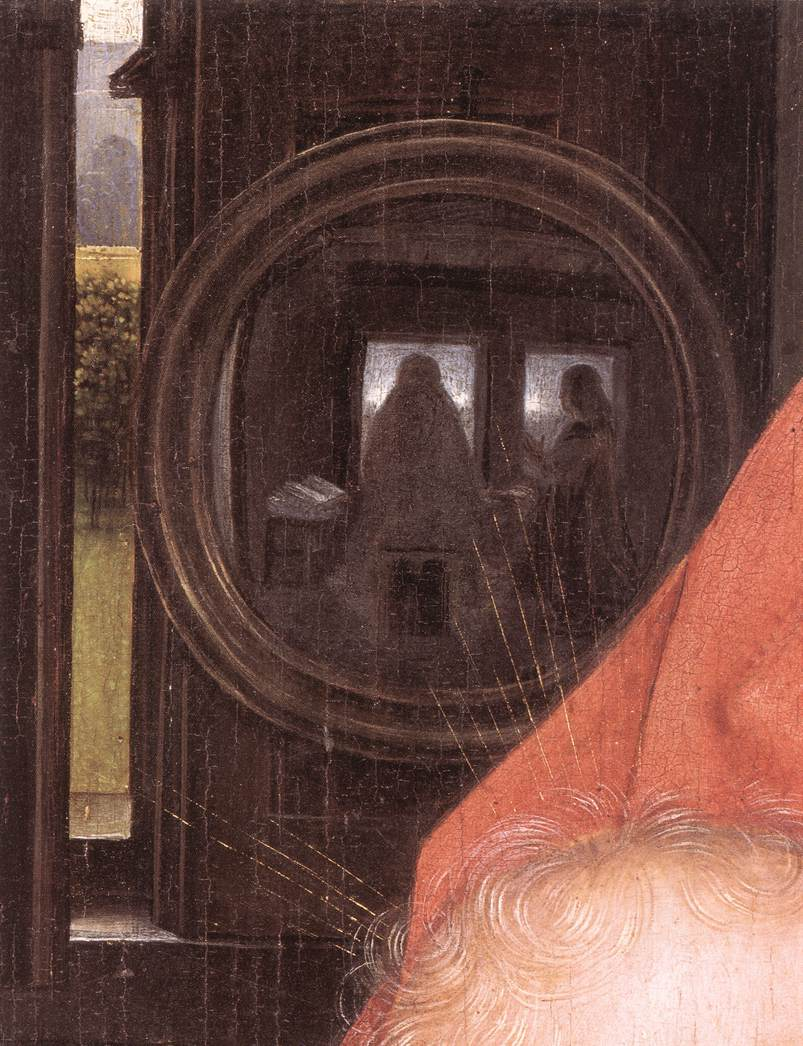
The mirror behind the Virgin

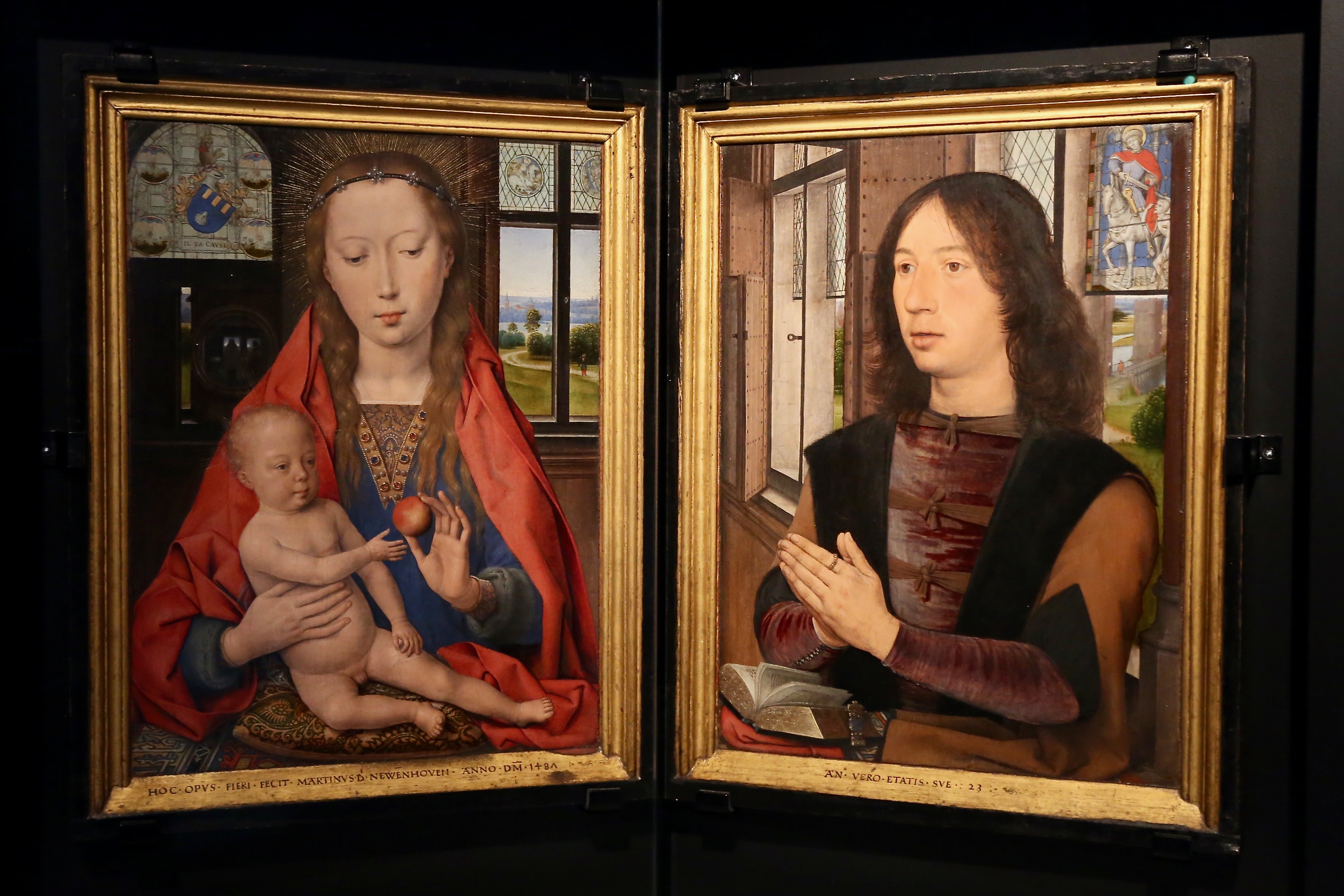
Possible display of the diptych with the two panels at an angle
