= Portrait of Folco Portinari =

Painting by Hans Memling

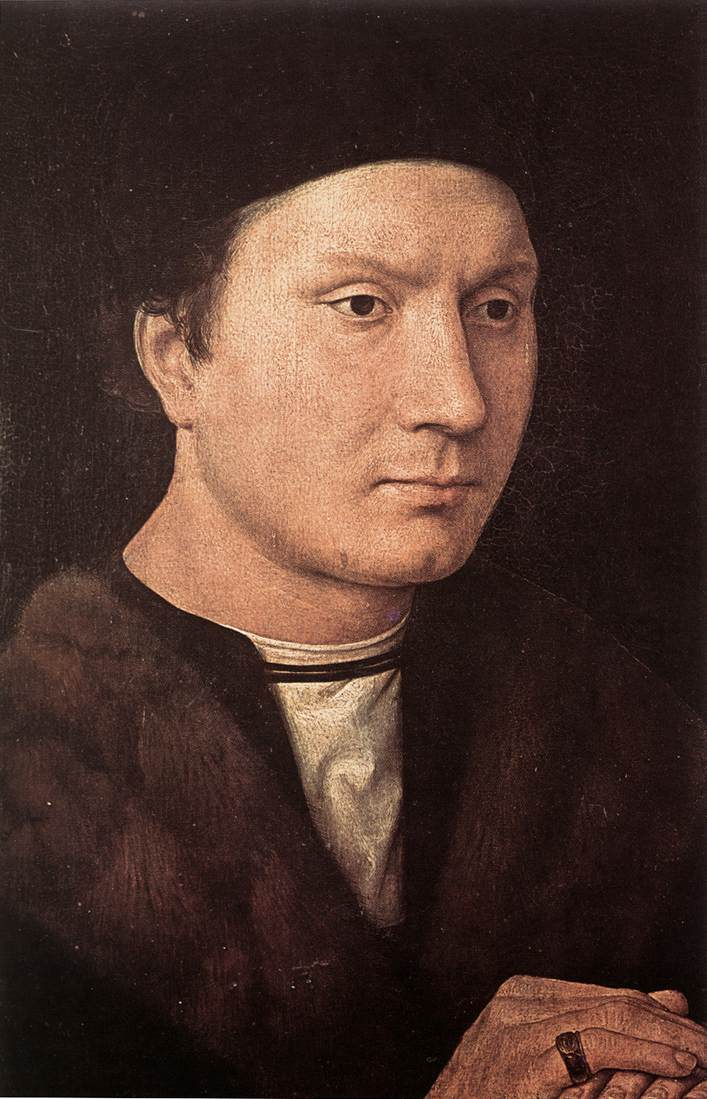
- Artist: Hans Memling
- Year: c. 1490
- Medium: Oil on panel
- Dimensions: 35 cm × 25 cm (14 in × 9.8 in)
- Location: Uffizi Gallery, Florence

The Portrait of Folco Portinari is a painting by the German painter Hans Memling, dating to c. 1490. It is displayed in the Uffizi Gallery, in Florence.

== History ==
The painting, for a period, was attributed to Antonello da Messina. It is documented for the first time at the Uffizi in 1863, assigned to an anonymous Flemish artist. Later, together with three other paintings in the gallery (Portrait of Benedetto Portinari, Portrait of an Unknown Man in a Landscape and Man with a Letter), the painting was attributed to Memling due to its high quality. Of the four, the portrait of Folco Portinari is considered the latest to have been painted.

Folco Portinari, a descendant of the Folco Portinari who founded the Hospital of Santa Maria Nuova, was a nephew of Tommaso Portinari, a Medici banker in Bruges. A list of leading Italians in Bruges in August 1498 is headed by Hieronimo Frescobaldi, followed by the banker Cornelio Atoviti, Folco Portinari, Jacobo Palazzoni (factor to Bernardo Rucellai), Oberto Spinola (representative of Batista Ricardini), and Baptista Spinola.

== References and sources ==
Sources

- Galleria degli Uffizi. Rome: Scala. 2003.
