= Madonna and Child with Saint James and Saint Dominic =

Painting by Hans Memling

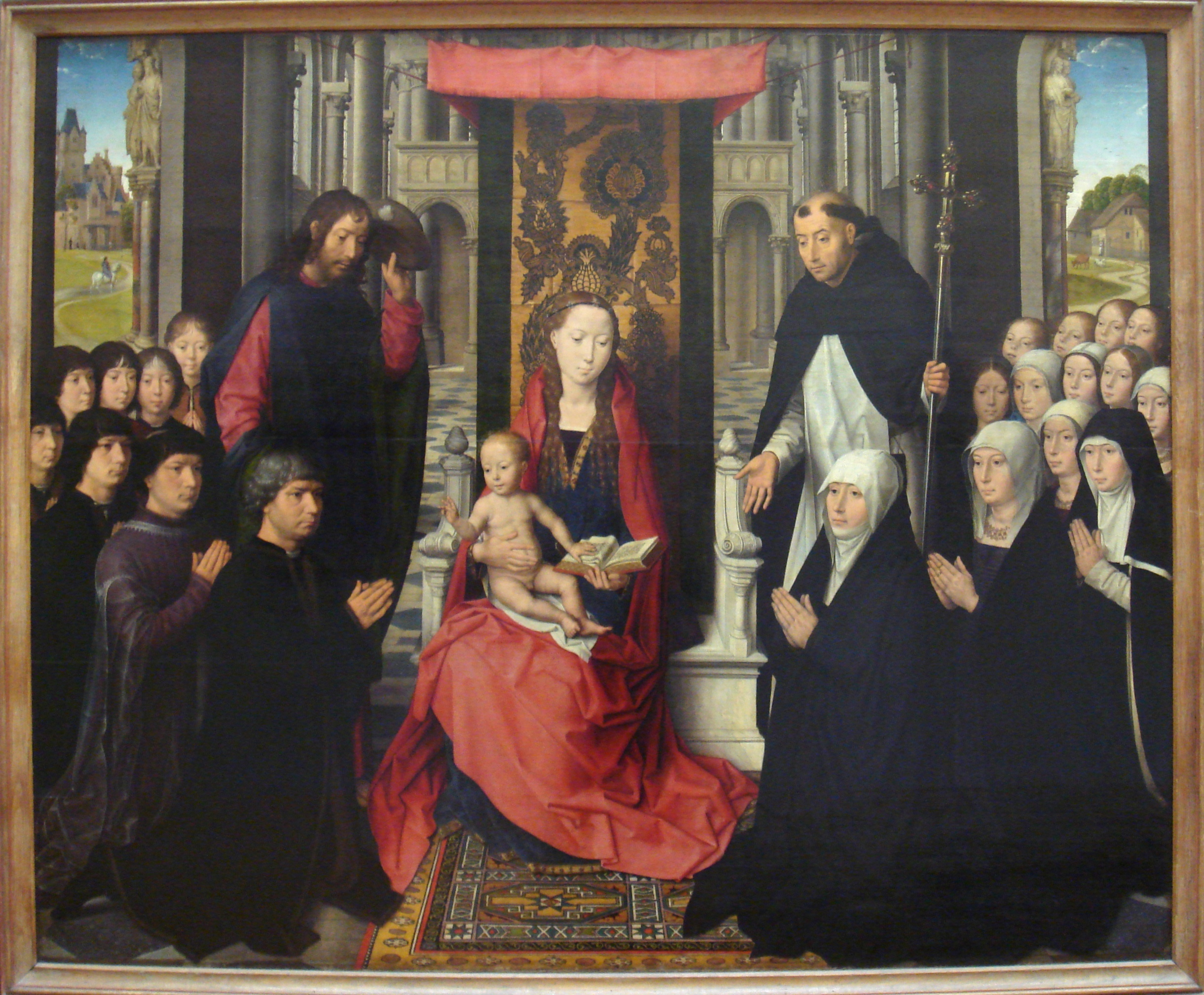
Madonna and Child with Saint James and Saint Dominic (c. 1485-1490) by Hans Memling

Madonna and Child with Saint James and Saint Dominic, Madonna and Child between Saint James and Saint Dominic Presenting the Donors and their Family or the Jacques Floreins Madonna is a c. 1485-1490 oil on panel painting by Hans Memling. It now hangs in the Louvre Museum, to which it was left in 1878 by Countess Duchâtel.

It adopts the sacred conversation theme then popular in northern Italy but rarer in Northern European painting of the time, also lacking the latter's usual side panels. It was commissioned for his family chapel by Jacques Florence (in Flemish Jacob Floreins), a spice merchant in Bruges, who died there in 1488. It was very probably completed after Floreins' death, since his wife is shown dressed as a widow.

Saint James was Jacques' name saint, whilst Saint Dominic was probably chosen since one of his daughters had become a Dominican nun and is shown dressed as one. The background is divided into three parts, with the scene placed in a church setting as sometimes seen in Jan van Eyck's work, though unlike in van Eyck it here opens out onto the exterior. To the left is a street and a cityscape, contrasting with the more rural landscape to the right.

The work may have inspired Hans Holbein the Younger's Darmstadt Madonna and its portrayal of a husband and wife facing each other with their children has also been compared with the Funk family epitaph attributed to Bernhard Strigel and now in the Schaffhouse in Switzerland, though this latter work lacks the saints and the Madonna and Child. Memling's work seems to have been taken to Spain thanks to the wishes of Jacob Floreins' Spanish widow, whose family was based in Burgos. General Jean Barthélemy Darmagnac was based in Burgos and looted the painting from there in 1808 during the French occupation of Spain. It was then acquired from him by count Duchâtel, whose wife then left it to its current owner in 1878.
