= Eleonora Verbeke =

Belgian nun and apothecary (1713–1786)

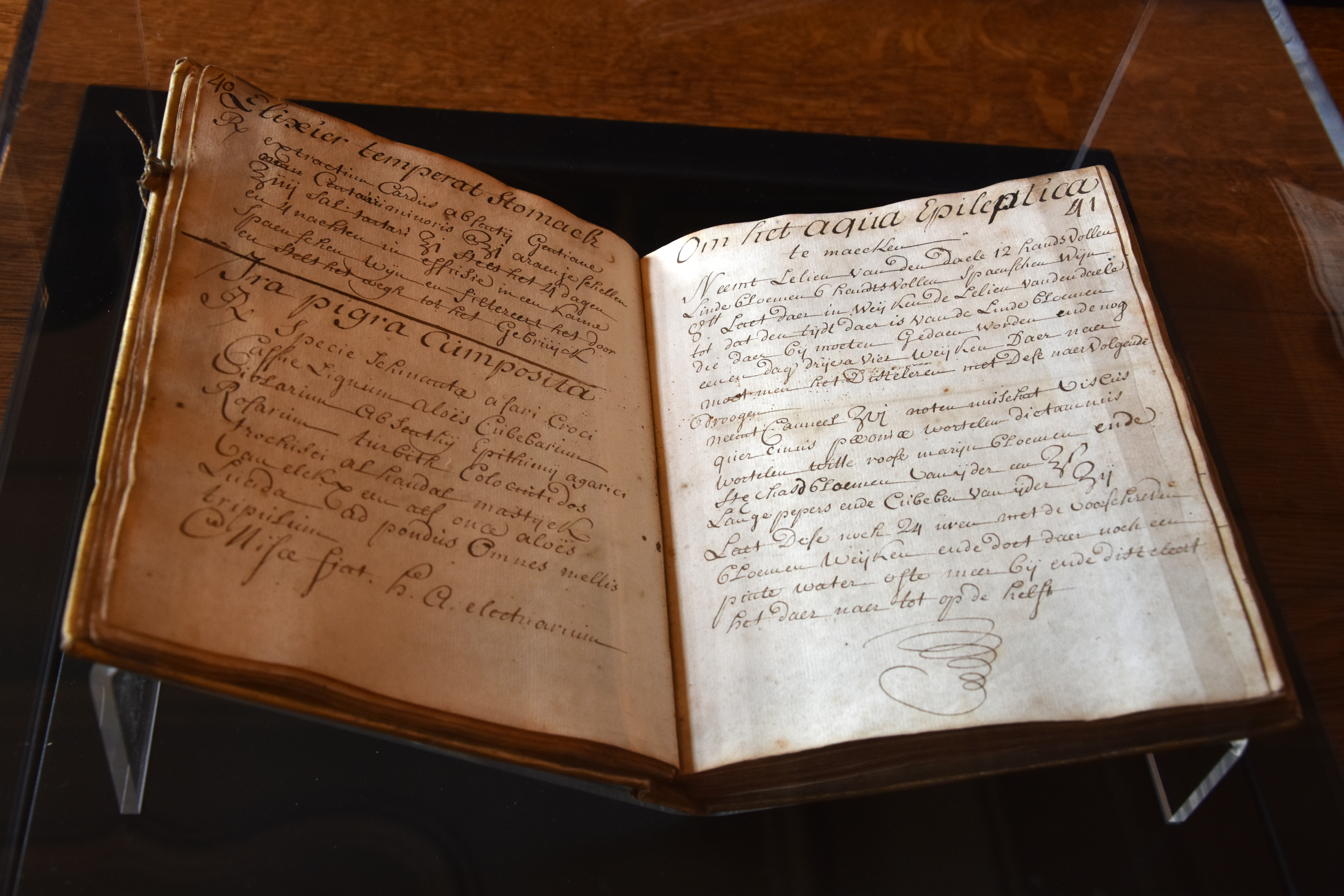
The Winckelbouck

Eleonora Verbeke (1713–1786) was a nun and apothecary at the St. John's Hospital in Bruges, West Flanders. She was a co-author of the Winckelbouck, in which, from 1751, she described all her medical recipes. Everyday recipes were also noted. She wrote in standard Dutch but also made use of the Bruges dialect.

On 13 April 2020, the square in Old St. John's Hospital was named after her.
