= Jan Floreins Altarpiece =

Triptych by Hans Memling

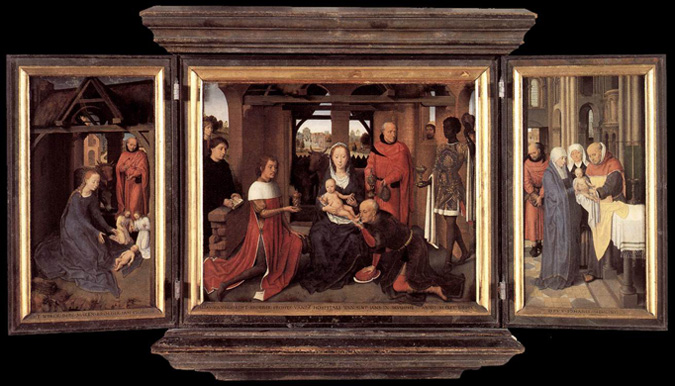
The altarpiece open

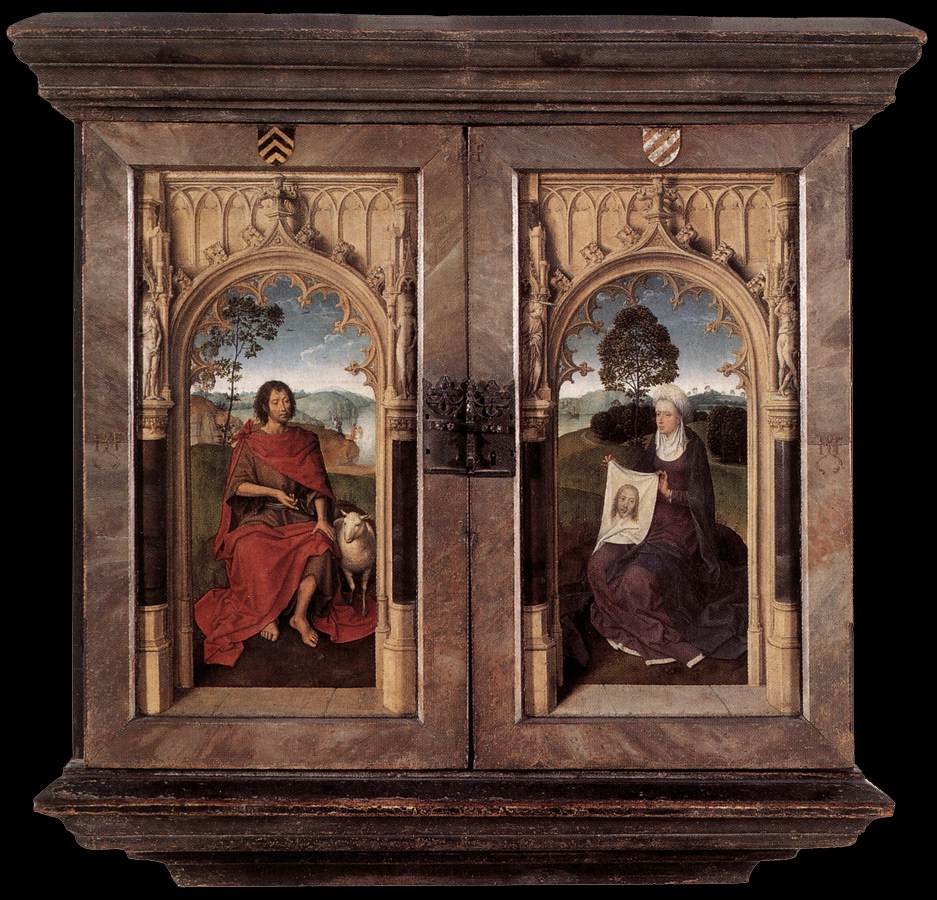
The altarpiece closed, showing outer panels of John the Baptist and saint Veronica.

The Jan Floreins Altarpiece or Triptych of Jan Floreins is a 1479 three-panel altarpiece, painted by Hans Memling for brother Jan Floreins of the Oud Sint-Janshospitaal in Bruges, where it still hangs as part of the collection of the Memlingmuseum.

== Sources ==
- Irene Smets, Ludiongids Het Memlingmuseum-Sint-Janshospitaal Brugge, Ludion Gent-Amsterdam, 2001 pp. 46–51
- (in Dutch) Stephan Kemperdick, Rogier van der Weyden, Könemann, Keulen, 1999 p. 131
