= Advent and Triumph of Christ =

Painting by Hans Memling

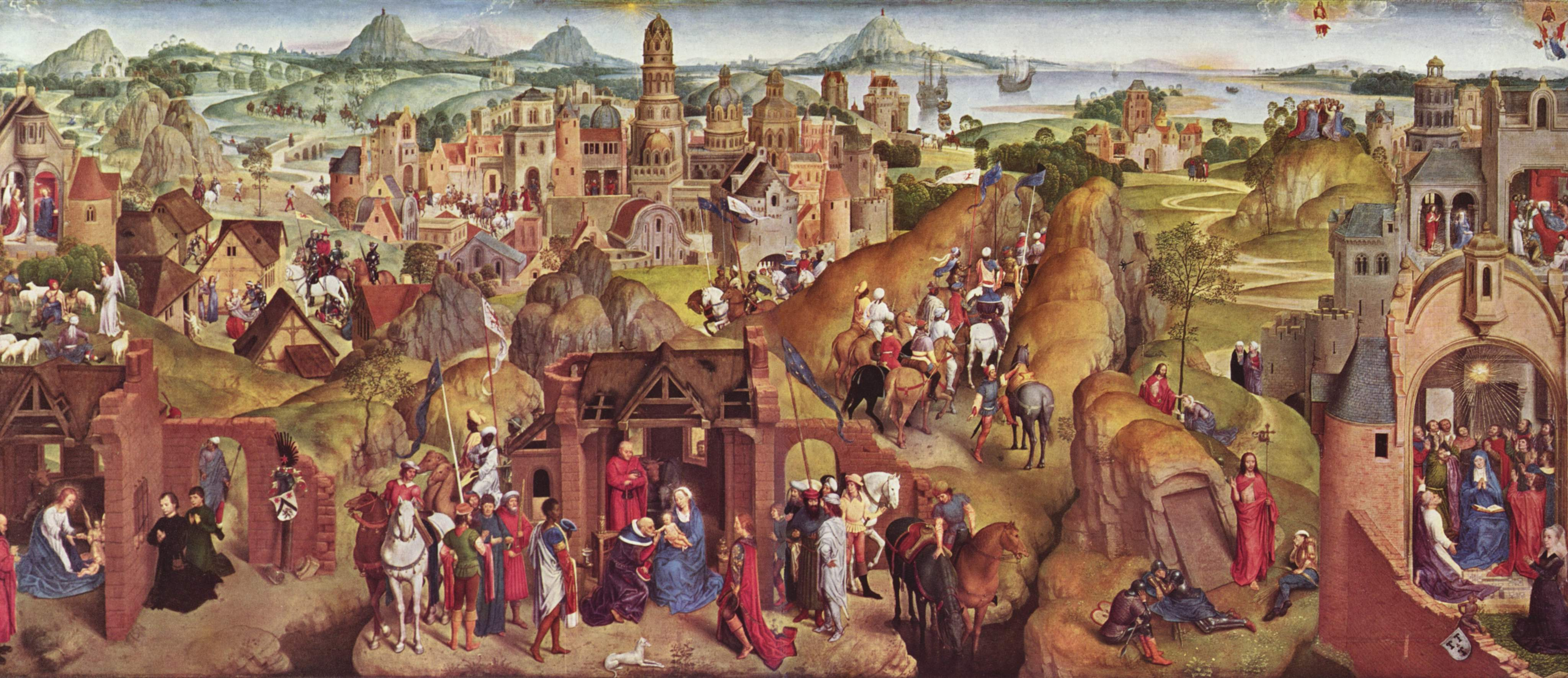
Advent and Triumph of Christ by Hans Memling, 1480, Alte Pinakothek, Munich. 81 × 189 cm.

Advent and Triumph of Christ is an oil painting on a panel of wood, painted c.1480 by German-born Early Netherlandish painter Hans Memling. It was made for the altar of the Tanners' guild in Our Lady's Church in Bruges, but is now held by the Alte Pinakothek in Munich.

The painting shows 25 episodes from the Life of Christ (although some have interpreted it as a version of the Seven Joys of the Virgin) combined in one narrative composition without a central dominating scene: including the Annunciation; the Annunciation to the shepherds; the Nativity; the Massacre of the Innocents; the Adoration of the Magi; the Passion; the Resurrection; the Ascension; Pentecost; the Dormition and Assumption of Mary.

A similar narrative style was employed by Memling for his earlier Scenes from the Passion of Christ (c.1470), commissioned by Tommaso Portinari and now held by the Galleria Sabauda, in Turin.

== Sources ==
- Till-Holger Borchert, De portretten van Memling (tentoonstelling Brugge 2005), Ludion, 2005 (nummer 2), p. 152.
