= Scenes from the Passion of Christ =

Painting by Hans Memling

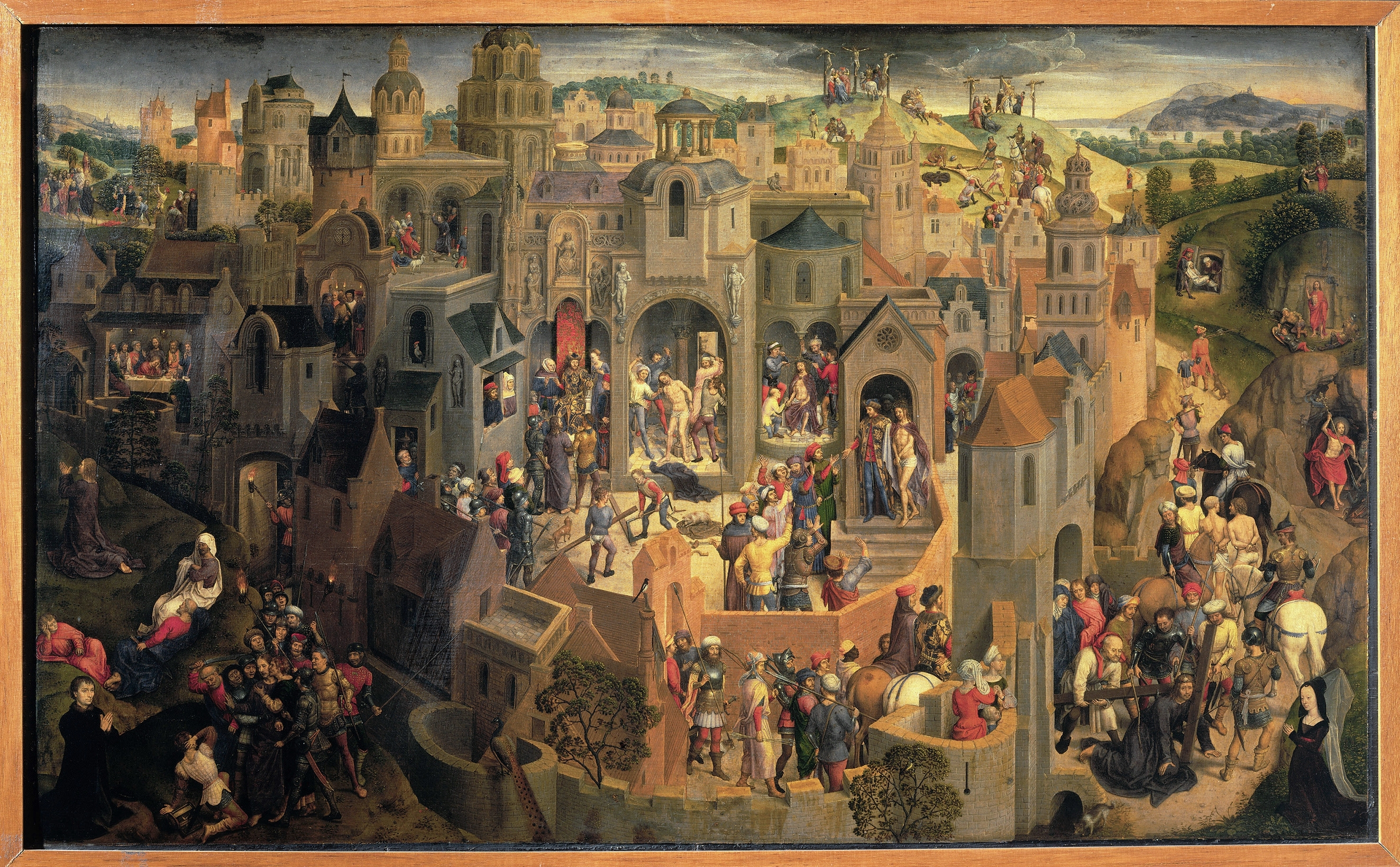
Scenes from the Passion of Christ by Hans Memling

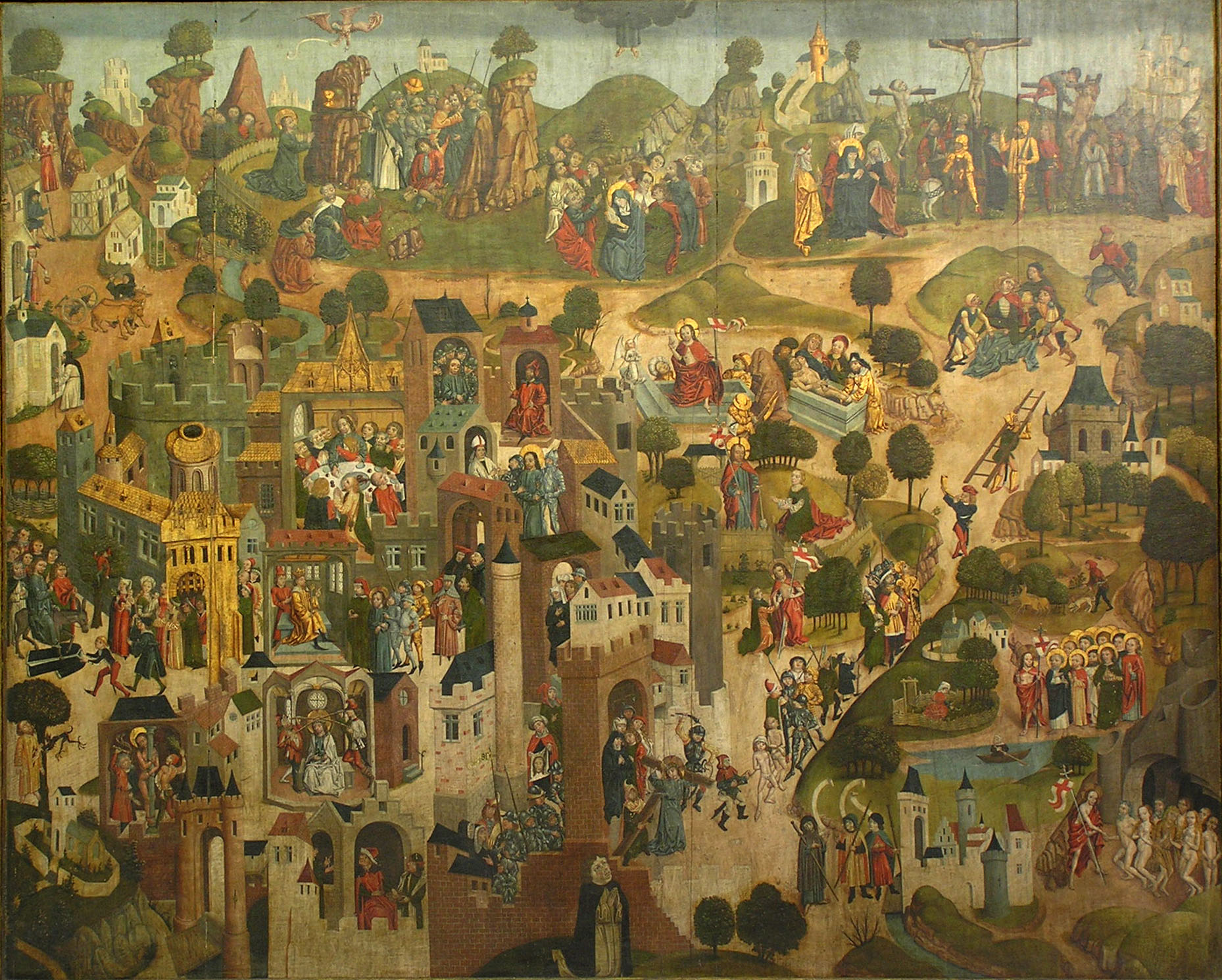
An unknown artist showed a number of small scenes in a similar Passion from Poland, ca. 1490, from the Entry into Jerusalem through the Golden Gate (lower left) to the Ascension of Jesus (centre top)

Scenes from the Passion of Christ is an oil painting on a panel of Baltic oak, painted c.1470 by German-born Early Netherlandish painter Hans Memling. The painting shows 23 vignettes of the Life of Christ combined in one narrative composition without a central dominating scene: 19 episodes from the Passion of Christ, the Resurrection, and three later appearances of the risen Christ (to Mary Magdalene, on the road to Emmaus, and at the Sea of Galilee). The painting was commissioned by Tommaso Portinari, an Italian banker based in Bruges, who is depicted in a donor portrait kneeling and praying in the lower left corner, with his wife, Maria Baroncelli, in a similar attitude in the lower right corner.

The painting is relatively small, 56.7 × 92.2 cm, and is unlikely to have been an altarpiece. It may have been intended for Portinari's chapel in the church of St Jacob in Bruges. It was not catalogued in Portinari's belongings when he died in 1501, and is thought to have been moved from Bruges to Florence between 1510 and 1520. It is first recorded in the collection of Cosimo I in Florence in 1550. The painting is now in the Galleria Sabauda in Turin.

== Description ==
The scenes of the Passion start in the distance at the top left with Jesus's entry into Jerusalem on Palm Sunday, passes through the town and out again to the bottom left to the Garden of Gethsemane, through the Passion scenes in the centre of the city (judgment of Pilate, the Flagellation of Jesus, Crowning with Thorns, Ecce Homo), then follows the procession of the cross back out of the city to the bottom right, then up to the top for the crucifixion, and ending in the distance at the top right with the appearances at Emmaus and Galilee. It includes seven of the traditional 14 Stations of the Cross, but adds several scenes before and after them, and omits 7: Jesus being given his cross, two occasions when Jesus falls carrying the cross, Jesus meeting his mother, Veronica wiping the face of Jesus, Jesus meeting the daughters of Jerusalem, and Jesus being stripped of his garments.

The scenes are distributed in and around an idealized Jerusalem, depicted as a walled medieval city with exotic towers topped by domes. The high "birds-eye" point of view makes Calvary visible behind the city. Unusually, for paintings of this period, the lighting across the painting is internal, associated with the rising sun on the far right, and consistent across the painting, with areas to the rear right in the light and areas to the front left in shadow.

=== The chronology ===
In order, the scenes are:

1.	Jesus rides into the city on a donkey on Palm Sunday	top left, outside the city gatehouse
2.	Jesus driving the money-changers out of the Temple	to the right of the entry of Jesus, under a double arch
3.	Judas betrays Jesus to the High Priests	down and to the left from the temple scene, in a narrow candle-lit archway
4.	The Last Supper	to the left of the betrayal, in a building with a pitched roof
5.	Prayer in the Garden of Gethsemane	below the Last Supper; three apostles lie sleeping while Jesus prays
6.	Arrest of Christ	down and right from the garden: Judas kisses Jesus; Peter cuts off Malchus' ear
7.	Denial of Peter	above and right from the arrest: Peter shown in a doorway, with cock crowing above
8.	Christ before Pilate	left of centre; Pilate seated on his throne (traditional Station of the Cross no.1)
9.	Flagellation of Christ	centre
10.	Christ in front of king Herodes	right of centre, skipping across two scenes in a narrow building set back
11.	Crowning with Thorns	right of the flagellation, Jesus receives a crown with thorns and a purple robe
12.	Ecce Homo	right from the crowning with thorns: Christ is shown to the people, who condemn him to death
13.	Making of the Cross	down and left, below the flagellation
14.	Carrying of the Cross; Simon of Cyrene bears the cross	below and proceeding to the right, a procession leaves from the city gate; on the road outside, Christ falls to his knees, and is assisted by Simon of Cyrene (traditional Stations of the Cross nos 3 and 5)
15.	Jesus is nailed to the cross	top, right of centre (traditional Station of the Cross no.11)
16.	Crucifixion	above, to the left, Jesus dies on Golgotha, together with two criminals (traditional Station of the Cross no.12)
17.	Descent from the Cross	to the right, Christ is removed from the cross at night (traditional Station of the Cross no.13)
18.	The Entombment	below the descent from the cross, to the right (traditional Station of the Cross no.14)
19.	Christ in Limbo	to the right of the procession, Christ with a crucifix
20.	Resurrection	above limbo, with the guards asleep
21.	Meeting with Mary Magdalene: noli me tangere	above the resurrection
22.	On the Road to Emmaus	top right
23.	Appearance before the apostles at the Sea of Galilee	to the left of the meeting with Mary Magdalene

== Similarities ==
Memling used a similar narrative style for his later Advent and Triumph of Christ (also known as Seven Joys of the Virgin) (1480), made for the altar of the Tanners' guild in Our Lady's Church in Bruges but now held by the Alte Pinakothek in Munich.

== Sources ==
- Web Gallery of Art
- Web Gallery of Art
- Northern Renaissance art, Susie Nash, Oxford University Press, 2008 ISBN 0-19-284269-2, p. 278-9
- Jesus: A Life in Pictures, Neil Morris, Salariya Publishers, 2004 ISBN 1-904642-49-7, p. 5
- Cyclic form and the English mystery plays: a comparative study of the English biblical cycles and their continental and iconographic counterparts; Volume 7 of Ludus : Medieval and early Renaissance theatre and drama, Peter Happé, Rodopi, 2004 ISBN 90-420-1652-3, p. 118-124.
