= Hans Memling =

German-Flemish painter (c. 1430–1494)

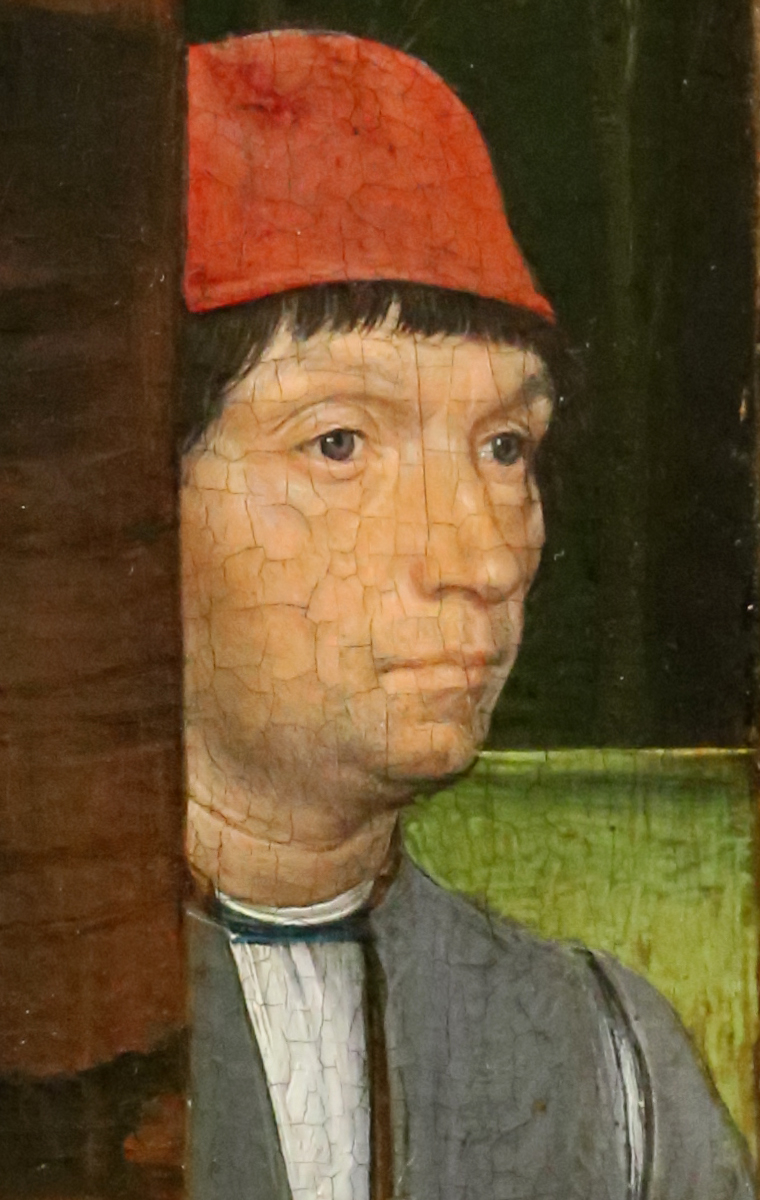
- Memling's Self-Portrait at National Gallery, London, c. 1478
- Born: Hans Memling c. 1430; Seligenstadt, Electorate of Mainz, Holy Roman Empire
- Died: 11 August 1494 (aged 63–64); Bruges, County of Flanders, Kingdom of France
- Education: Workshop of Rogier van der Weyden
- Known for: Painting; drawing
- Notable work: The Last Judgement (c. 1467–1471); Scenes from the Passion of Christ (c. 1470); Adoration of the Magi (c. 1479–1480); Annunciation (c. 1480–1489); Madonna and Child with Saint James and Saint Dominic (c. 1488–1490)
- Movement: Early Netherlandish Painting

Hans Memling (also spelled Memlinc; c. 1430 – 11 August 1494) was a German-Flemish painter who worked in the tradition of Early Netherlandish painting. Born in the Middle Rhine region, he probably spent his childhood in Mainz. During his apprenticeship as a painter he moved to the Netherlands and spent time in the Brussels workshop of Rogier van der Weyden. In 1465 he was made a citizen of Bruges, where he became one of the leading artists and the master of a large workshop. A tax document from 1480 lists him among the wealthiest citizens. Memling's religious works often incorporated donor portraits of the clergymen, aristocrats, and burghers (bankers, merchants, and politicians) who were his patrons. These portraits built upon the styles which Memling learned in his youth.

He married Anna de Valkenaere sometime between 1470 and 1480, and they had three children. Memling's art was rediscovered in the 19th century, attaining wide popularity.

== Life and works ==
Born in Seligenstadt, near Frankfurt in the Middle Main region, Memling served his apprenticeship at Mainz or Cologne and later worked in the Low Countries under Rogier van der Weyden (c. 1455–1460) in Brussels, Duchy of Brabant. He then worked at Bruges, County of Flanders by 1465.

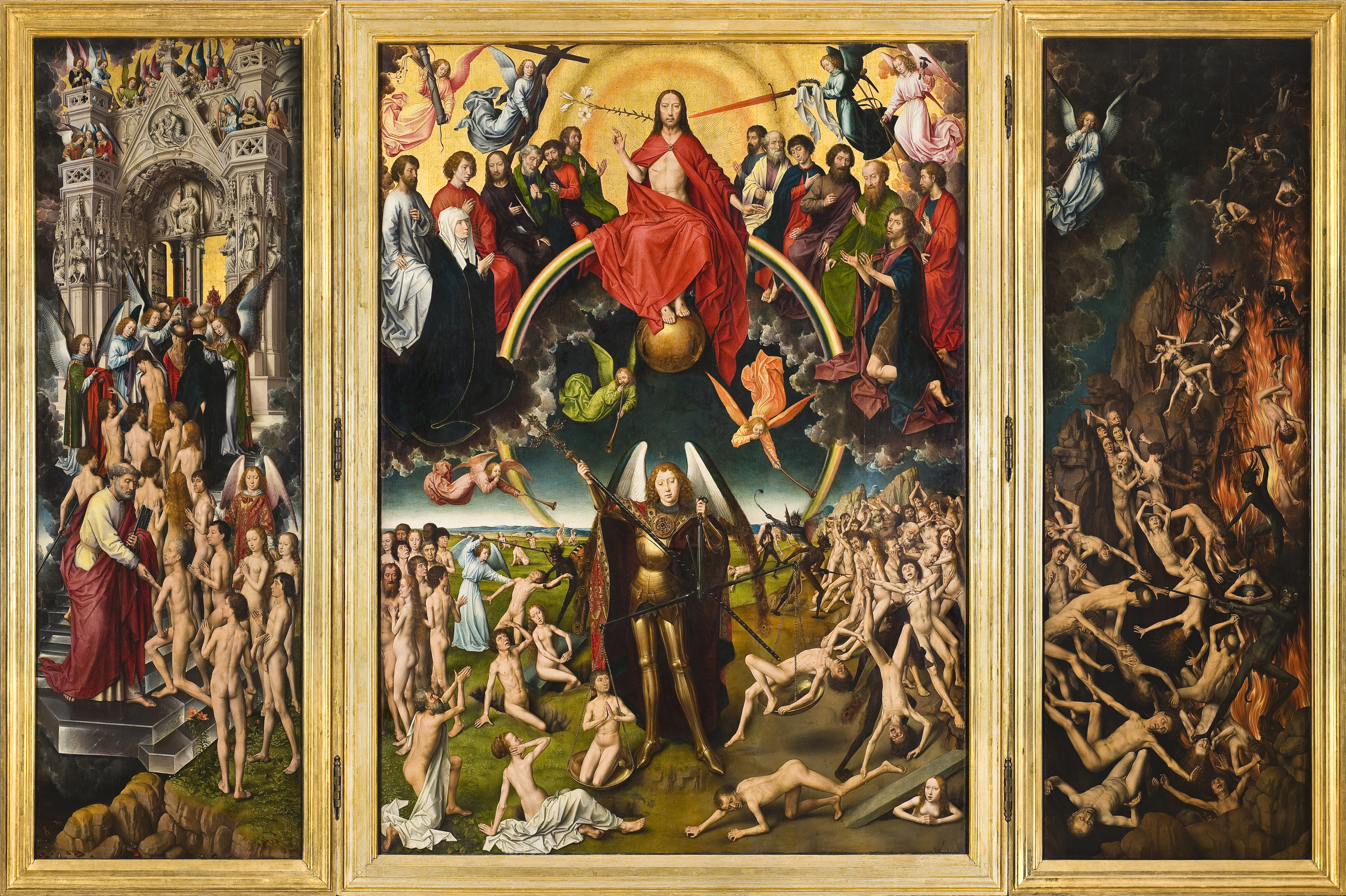
Last Judgement, 1466–1473. National Museum, Gdańsk

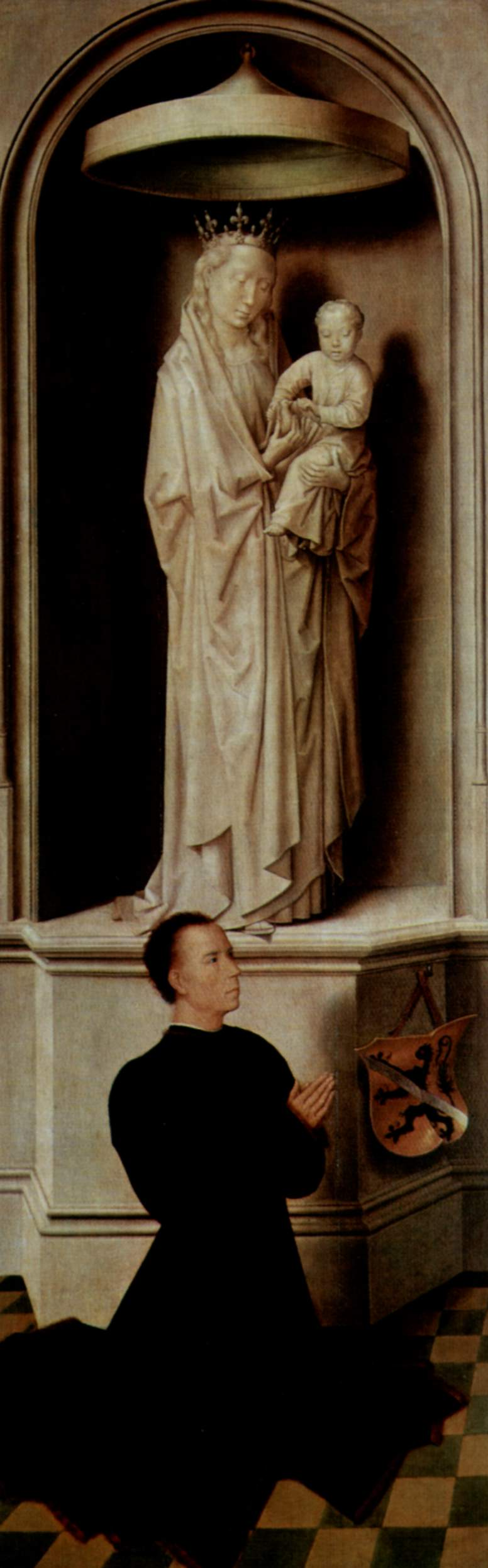
Donor portrait of Angelo di Jacopo Tani; above it, the Virgin Mary with Child.

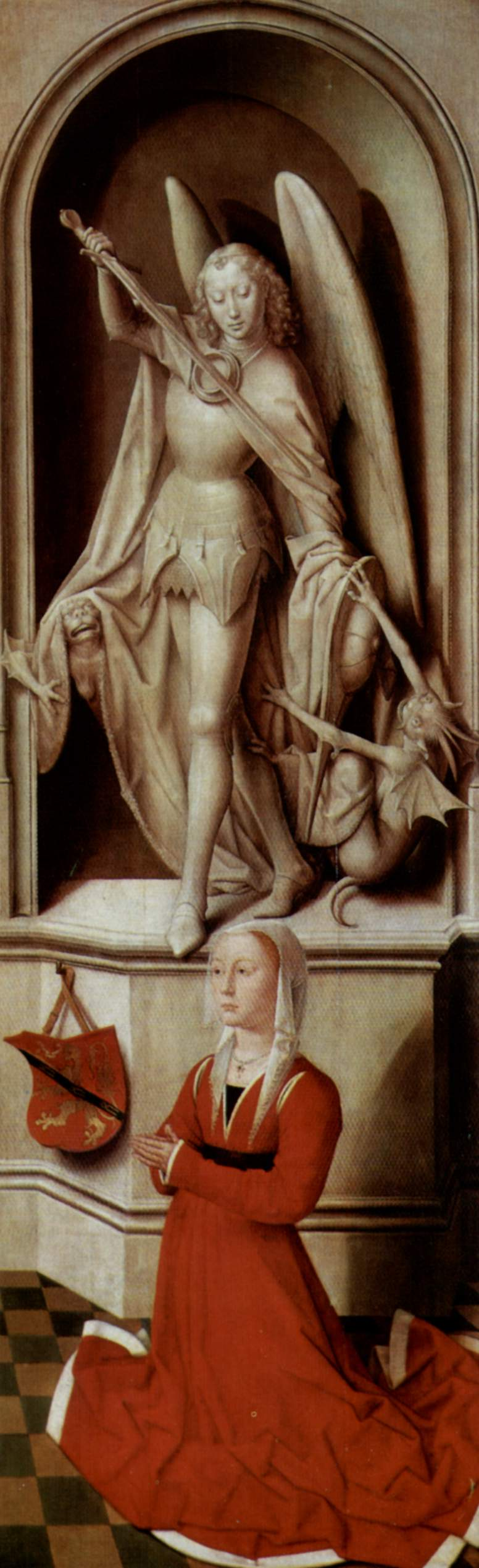
Donor portrait of his wife Caterina di Francesco Tangeli; above it, the Archangel Michael.

He painted for the Hospitallers in 1479 and 1480. In 1477, when he was believed dead, he was under contract to create an altarpiece for the gild-chapel of the booksellers of Bruges. This altarpiece, Scenes of the Passion of Christ, is now in the Galleria Sabauda of Turin. The Last Judgment, which had been in Gdańsk since 1473 is now in the National Museum there. The Last Judgment was commissioned by Angelo Tani, erstwhile director of the Bruges branch of the Medici Bank, for a chapel at what is now the Badia Fiesolana in Fiesole. When the triptych is closed Tani and his wife are shown kneeling in prayer. It was shipped to Fiesole on a vessel that was captured by Danzig privateer Paul Beneke in April 1473.

The oldest allusions to pictures connected to Memling point to his relations with the Burgundian court, which was held in Brussels. The inventories of Margaret of Austria, drawn up in 1524, allude to a triptych of the God of Pity by Rogier van der Weyden, of which the wings containing angels were painted by "Master Hans".

Memling's painting of John the Baptist (c. 1470) is in the Munich Alte Pinakothek. He painted the Last Judgment in Gdańsk.

Memling's portraits, in particular, were popular in Italy. According to Paula Nuttall, Memling's distinctive contribution to portraiture was his use of landscape backgrounds, characterized by "a balanced counterpoint between top and bottom, foreground and background: the head offset by the neutral expanse of sky, and the neutral area of the shoulders enlivened by the landscape detail beyond". Memling's portrait style influenced the work of numerous late-15th-century Italian painters, and is evident in works such as Raphael's Portraits of Agnolo and Maddalena Doni. Purchasers of his paintings include Cardinal Grimani and Cardinal Bembo at Venice, and the heads of the House of Medici at Florence.

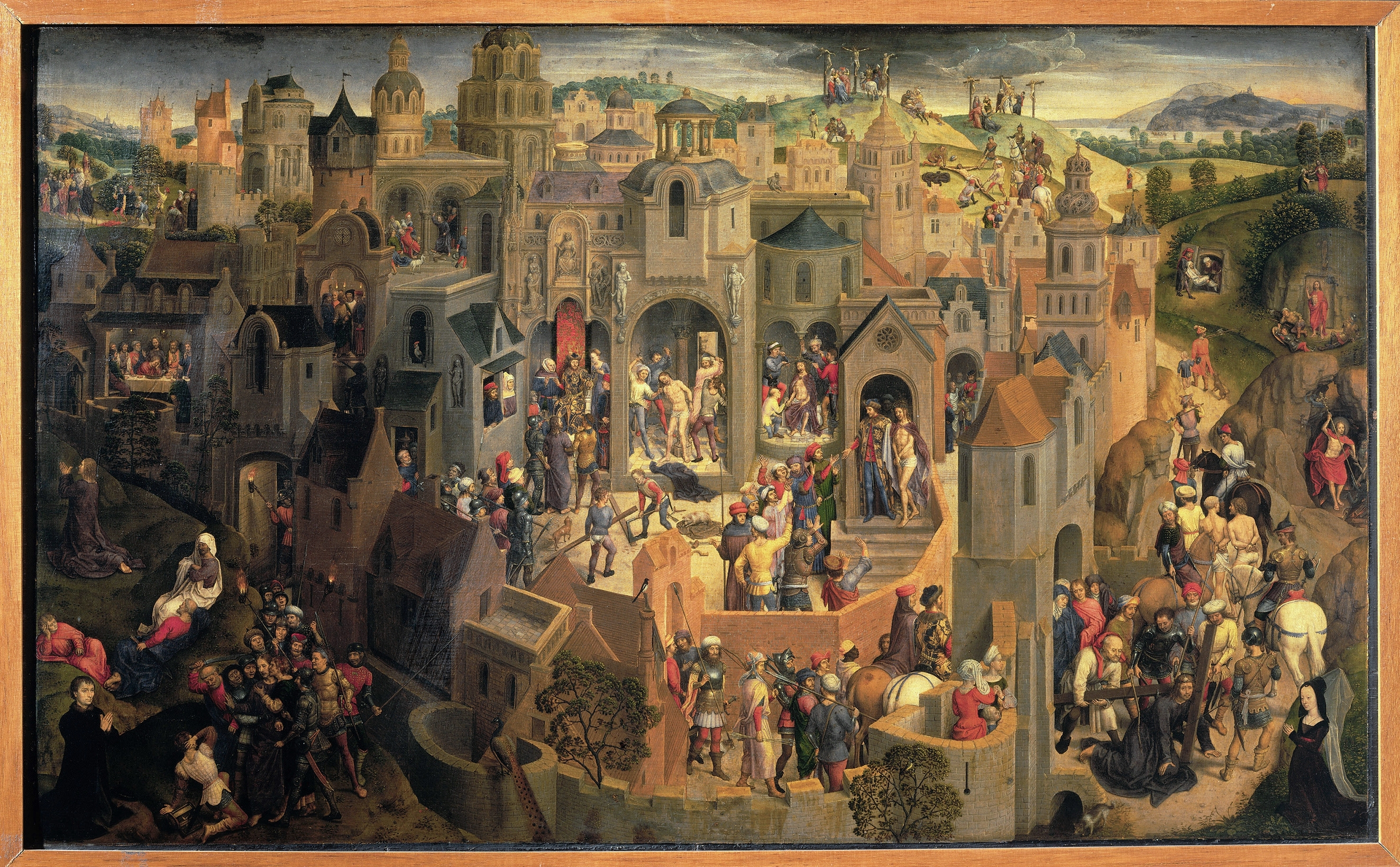
Scenes from the Passion of Christ, c. 1470, Galleria Sabauda

Other paintings include the Madonna and Saints (which passed from the Duchatel collection to the Louvre), the Virgin and Child (painted for Sir John Donne and now at the National Gallery, London), and the four attributed portraits in the Uffizi Gallery of Florence (including the Portrait of Folco Portinari), the Scenes from the Passion of Christ in the Galleria Sabauda of Turin and the Advent and Triumph of Christ

Around 1492, Memling was commissioned to paint the Najera Altarpiece for the Benedictine Monastery of Santa Maria la Real in Najera, Rioja, Spain. The altarpiece, which was completed in Flanders, consisted of an image of God surrounded by angels playing a variety of musical instruments while atop a row of clouds before a golden background. Recent scholarship by Bart Fransen has determined that Gonzalo de Cabredo and Abbot Pablo Martinez commissioned the creation of this artwork.

Memling became sufficiently prosperous that his name appears on a list of the 875 richest citizens of Bruges who were obligatory subscribers to the loan raised by Maximilian I of Austria, to finance hostilities towards France in 1480. Memling's name does not appear on subsequent subscription lists of this type.

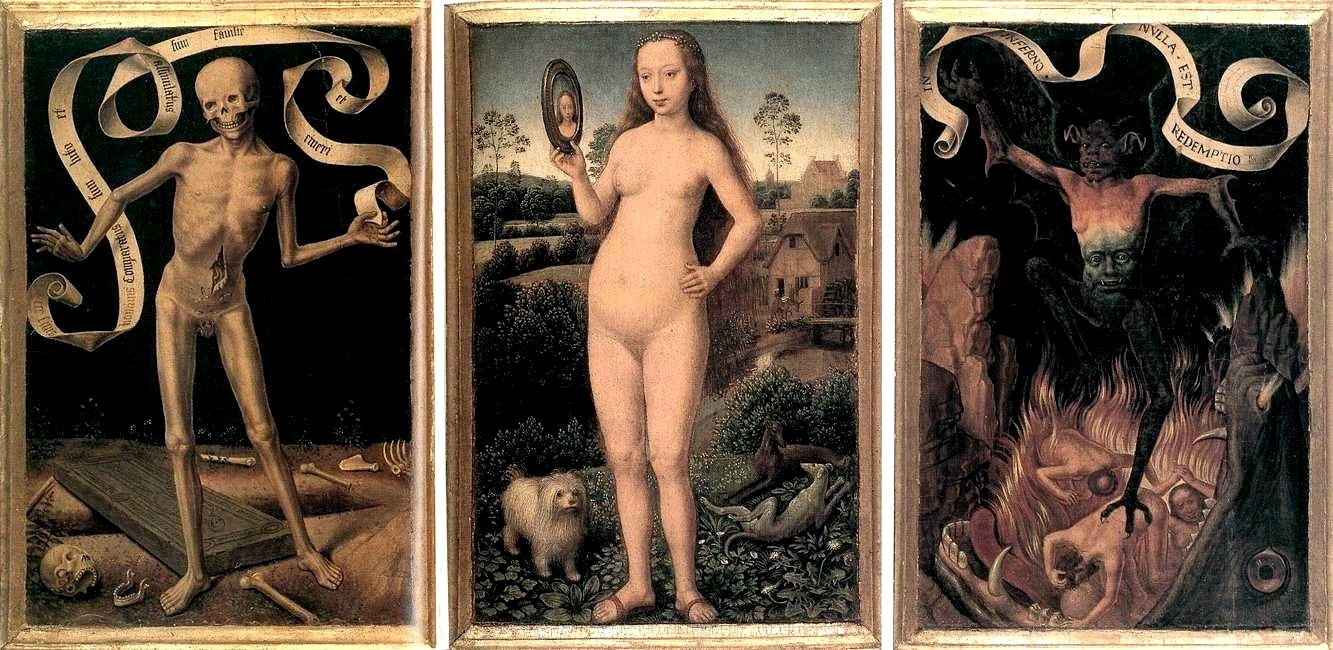
Earthly Vanity and Divine Salvation (triptych, front) c. 1485 Oil on oak panel, 22 × 13 cm (each wing) Musée des Beaux-Arts de Strasbourg

In his later years, he painted the Shrine of St Ursula in the museum of the hospital of Bruges, St Christopher and Saints (1484) in the academy, the Diptych of Maarten van Nieuwenhove in the hospital of Bruges, and a large Crucifixion, with scenes from the Passion, (1491) from the Lübeck Cathedral (Dom) of Lübeck, now in Lübeck's St. Annen Museum. Near the close of Memling's career, the registers of the painters' guild at Bruges give the names of two apprentices who served their time with Memling and paid dues on admission to the guild in 1480 and 1486.

He died in Bruges. The trustees of his will appeared before the court of wards at Bruges on 10 December 1495, and records indicate Memling left behind several children and considerable property.

== Gallery ==
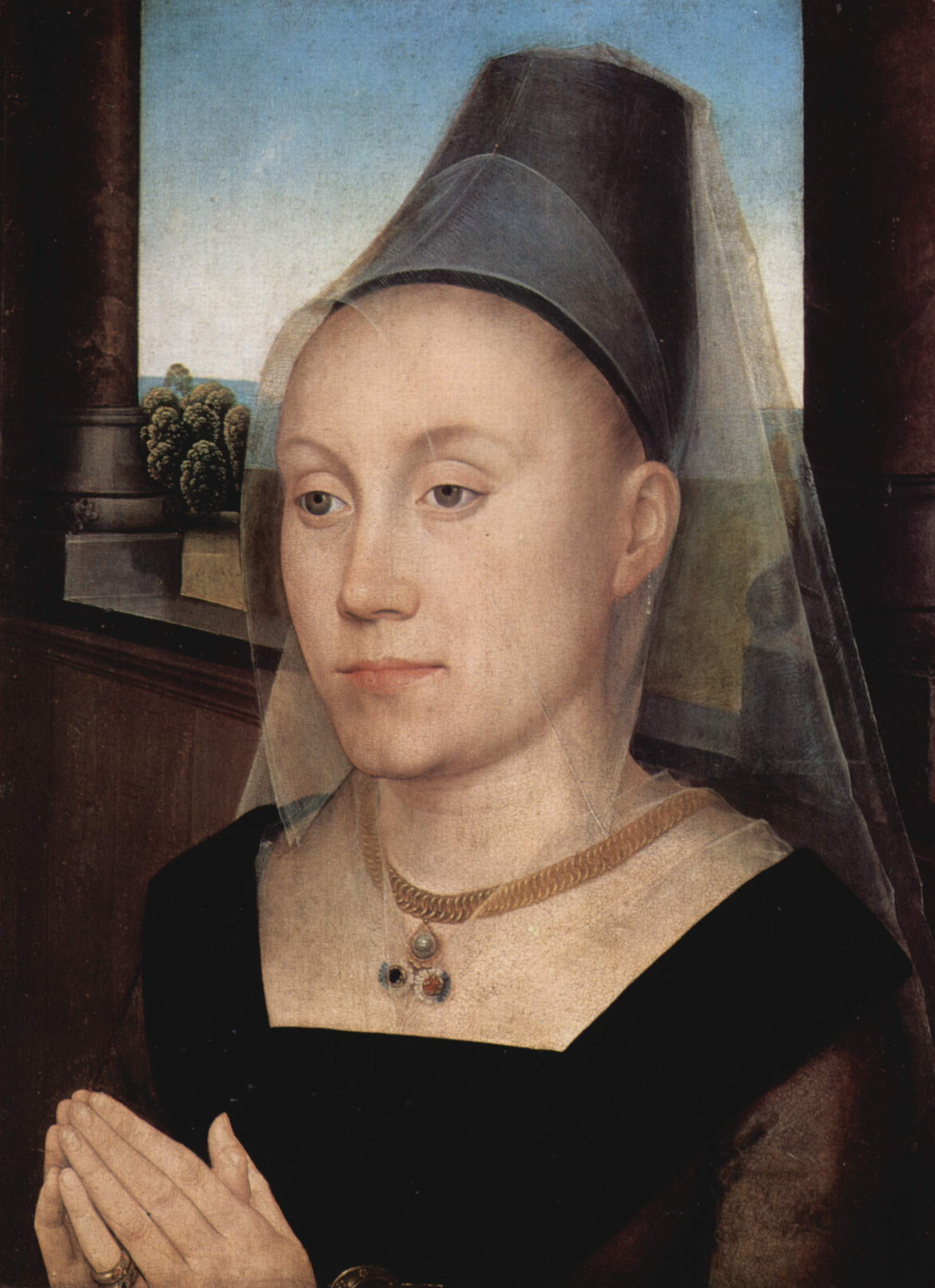
Portrait of Barbara van Vlaendenbergh, c. 1470-72, Metropolitan Museum of Art

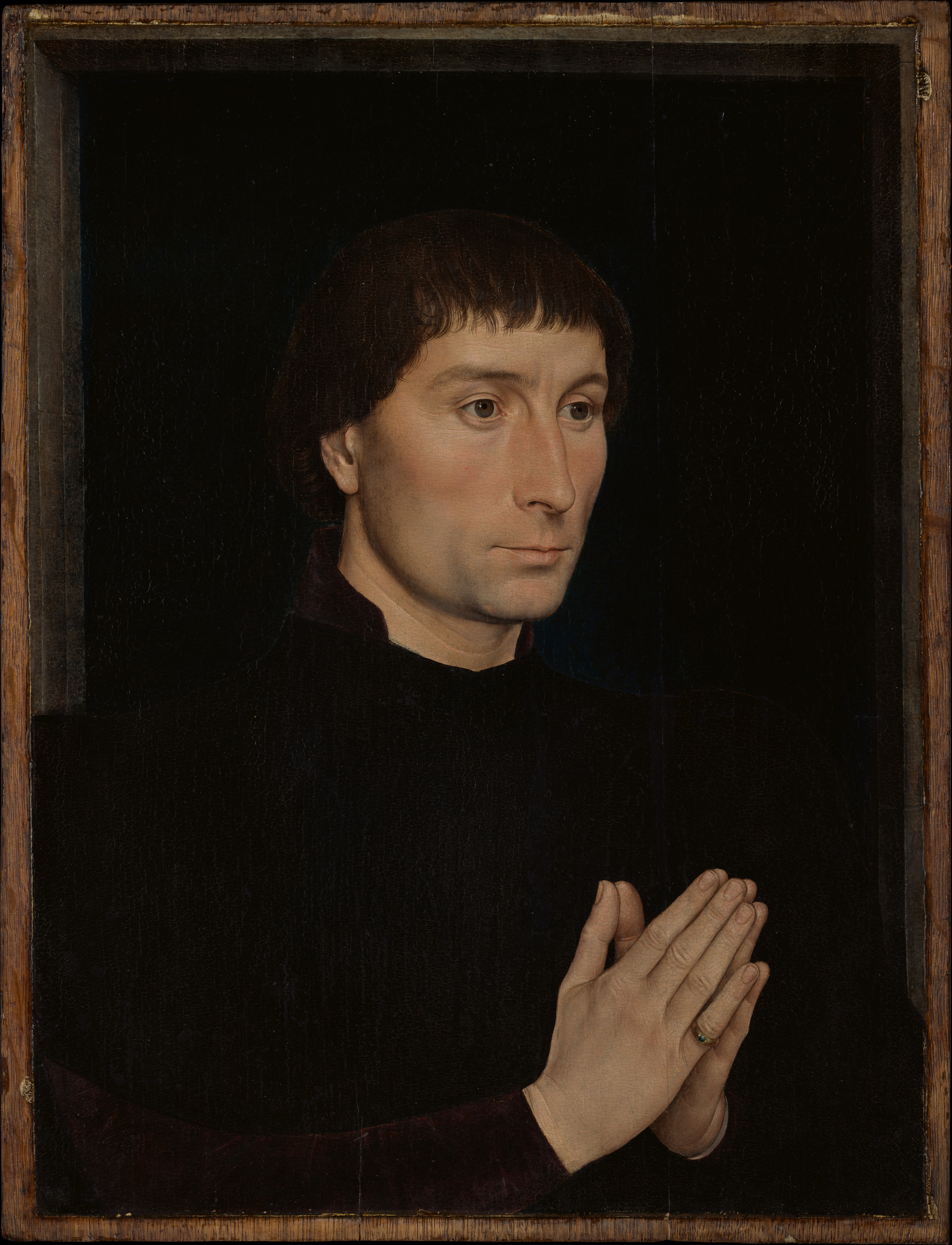
Portrait of Tommaso Portinari, c. 1470, Metropolitan Museum of Art

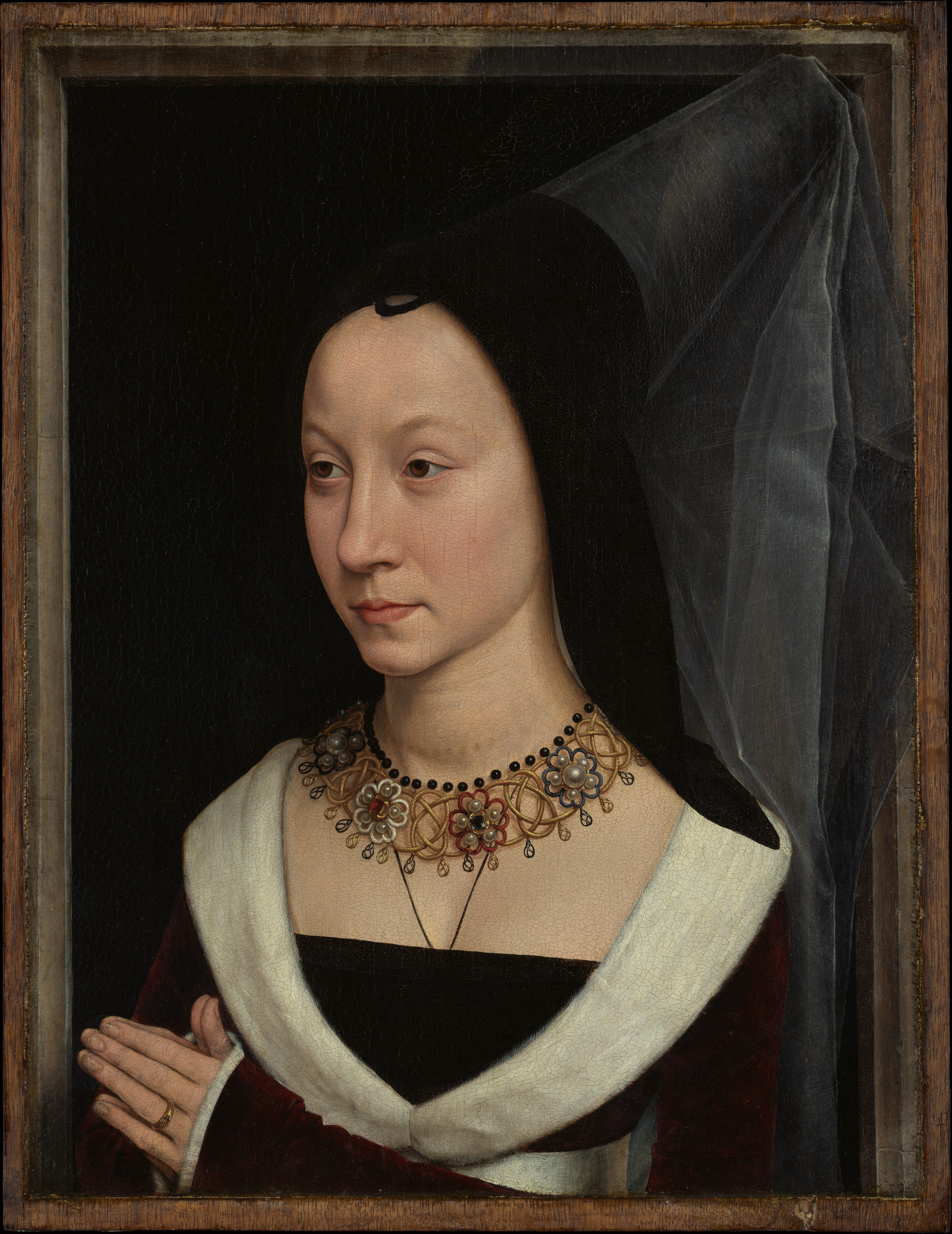
Portrait of Maria Portinari, c. 1470-72, Metropolitan Museum of Art

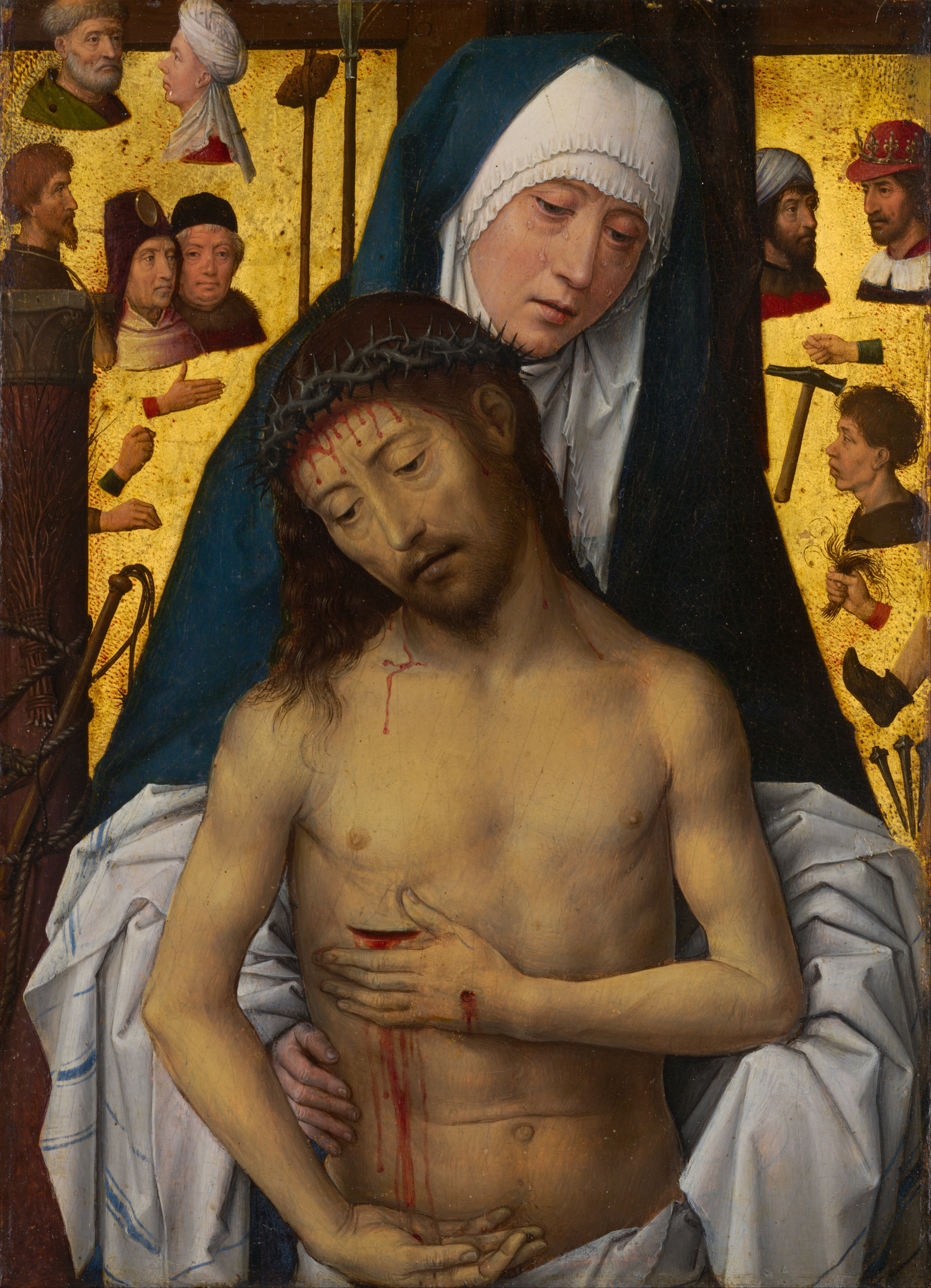
The Man of Sorrows in the arms of the Virgin, 1475 or 1479, National Gallery of Victoria

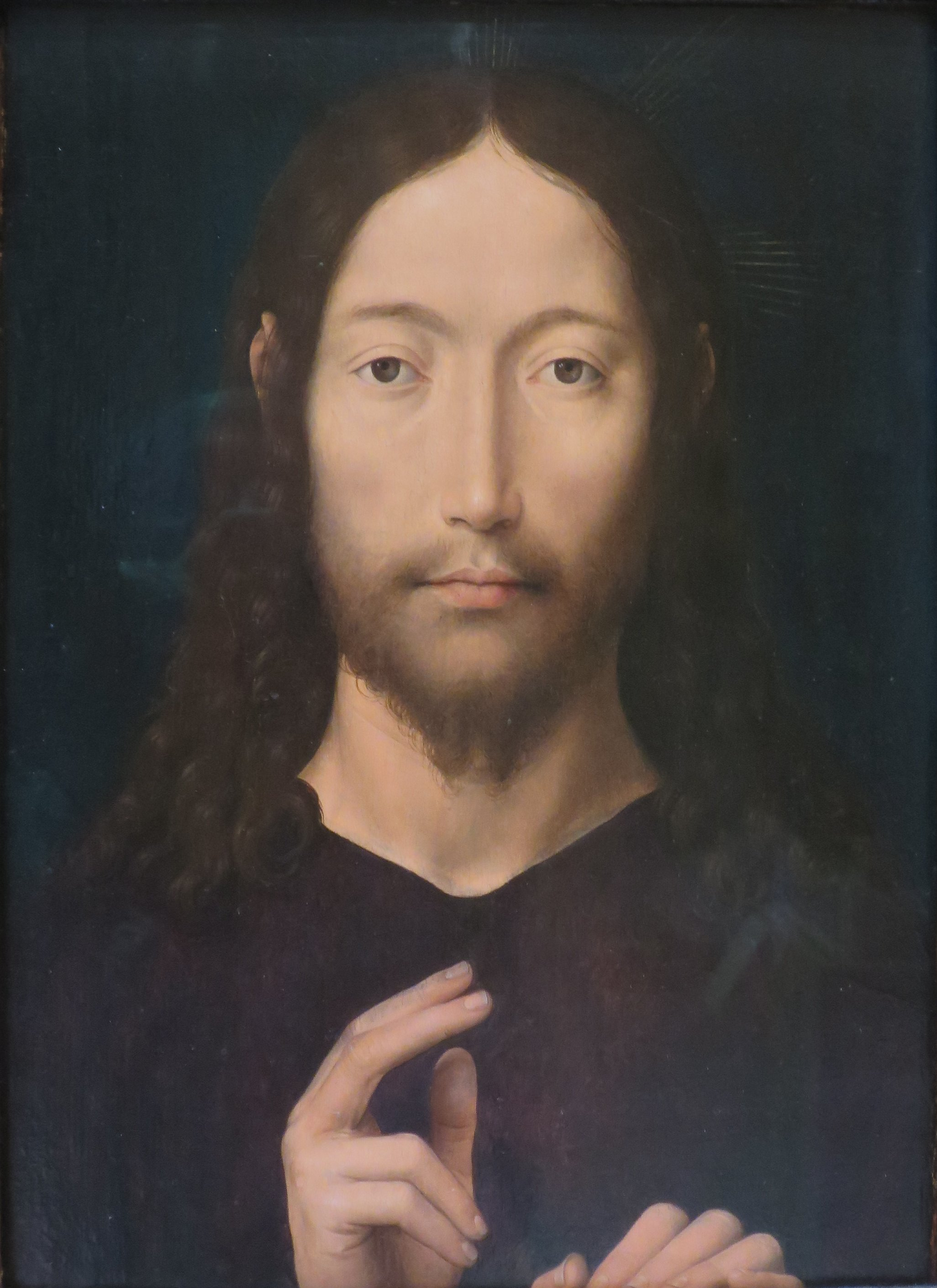
Christ Giving His Blessing, 1478, Norton Simon Museum

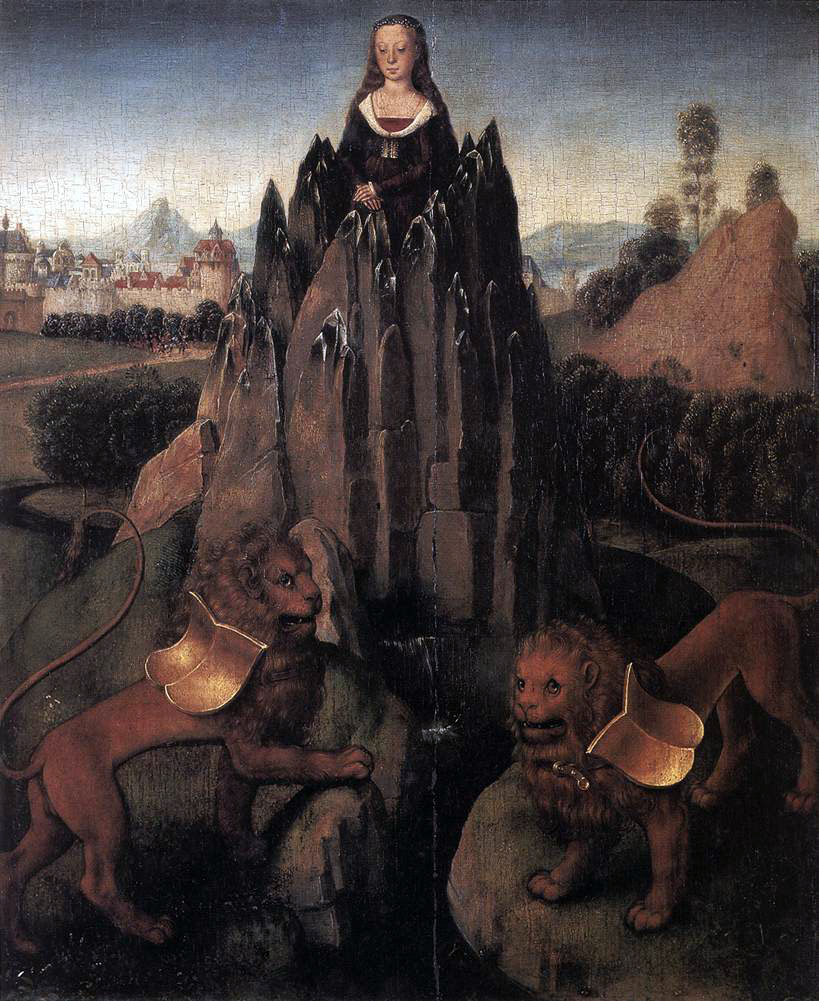
Allegory with a Virgin, 1479–80, Musée Jacquemart-André

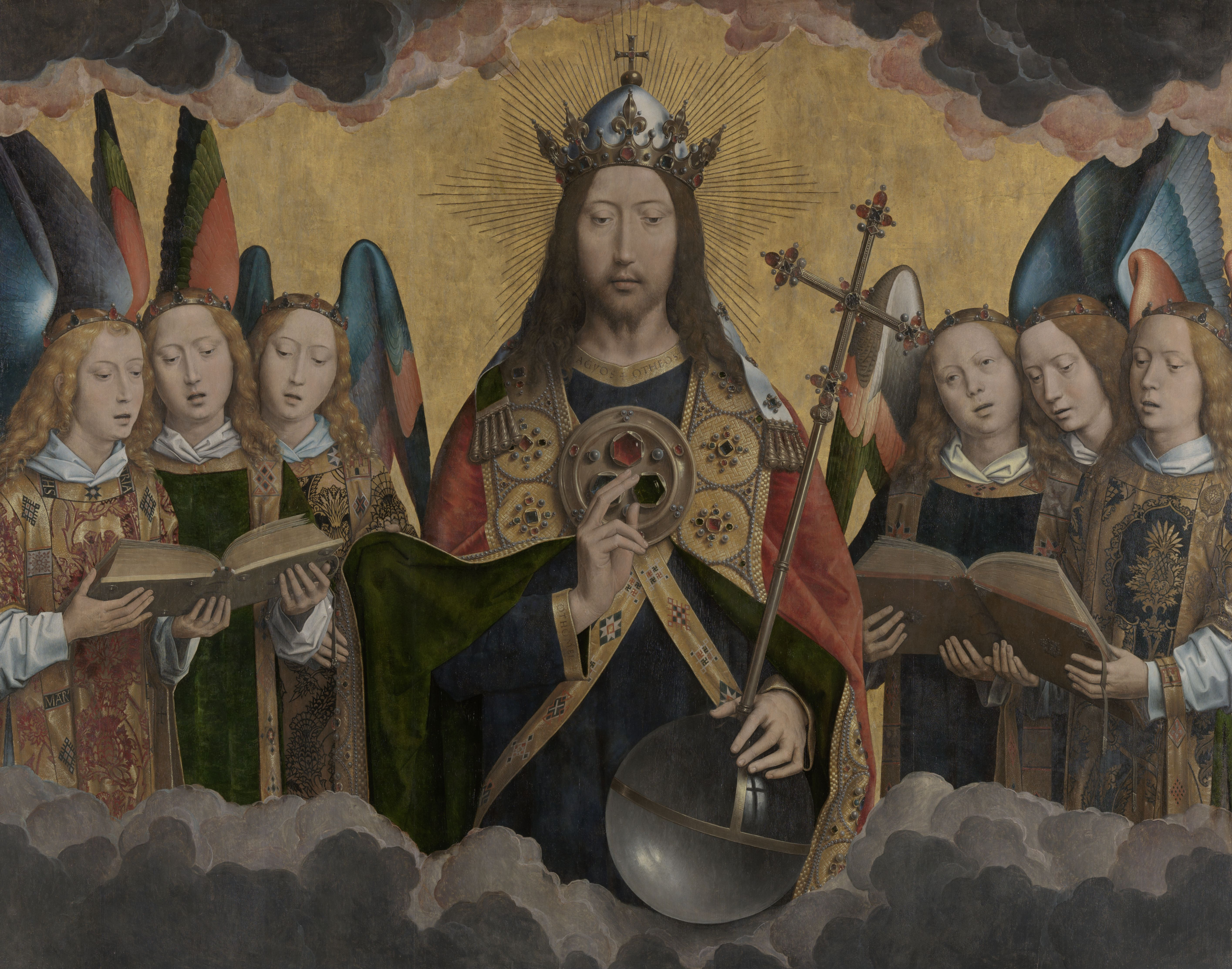
Christ Surrounded by Musician Angels, c. 1480, Royal Museum of Fine Arts Antwerp

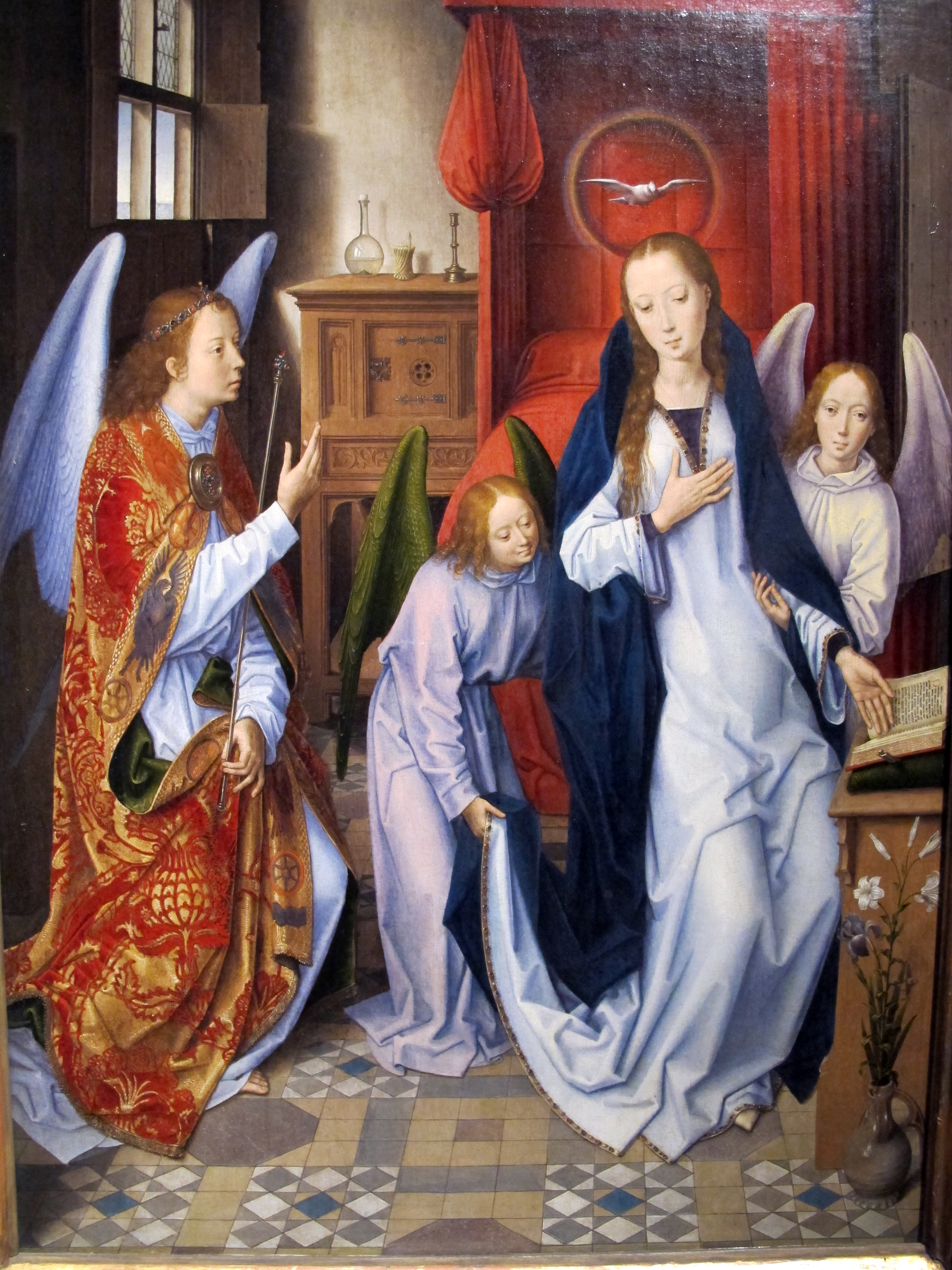
Annunciation, 1480–89, Metropolitan Museum of Art

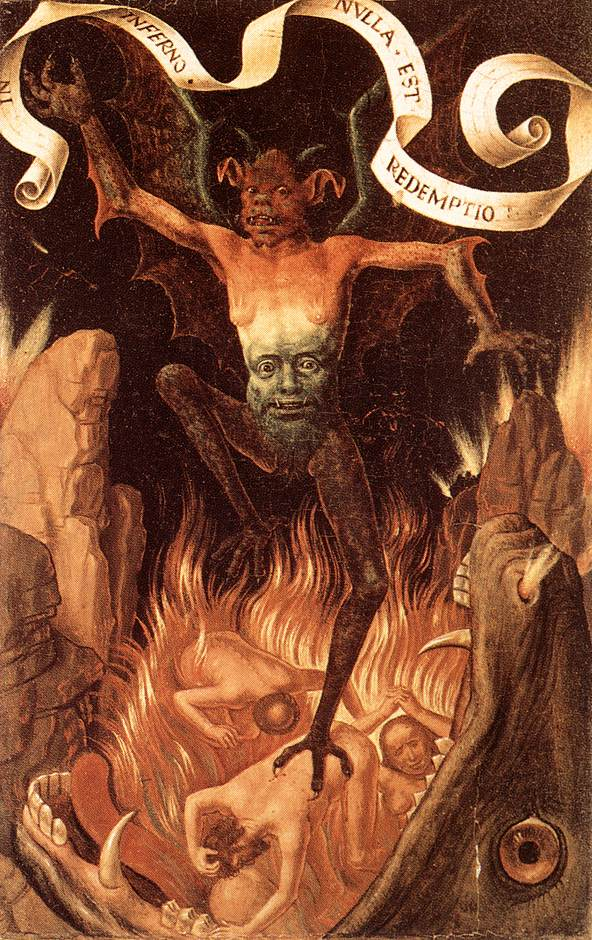
Hell, c. 1485, Musée des Beaux-Arts de Strasbourg

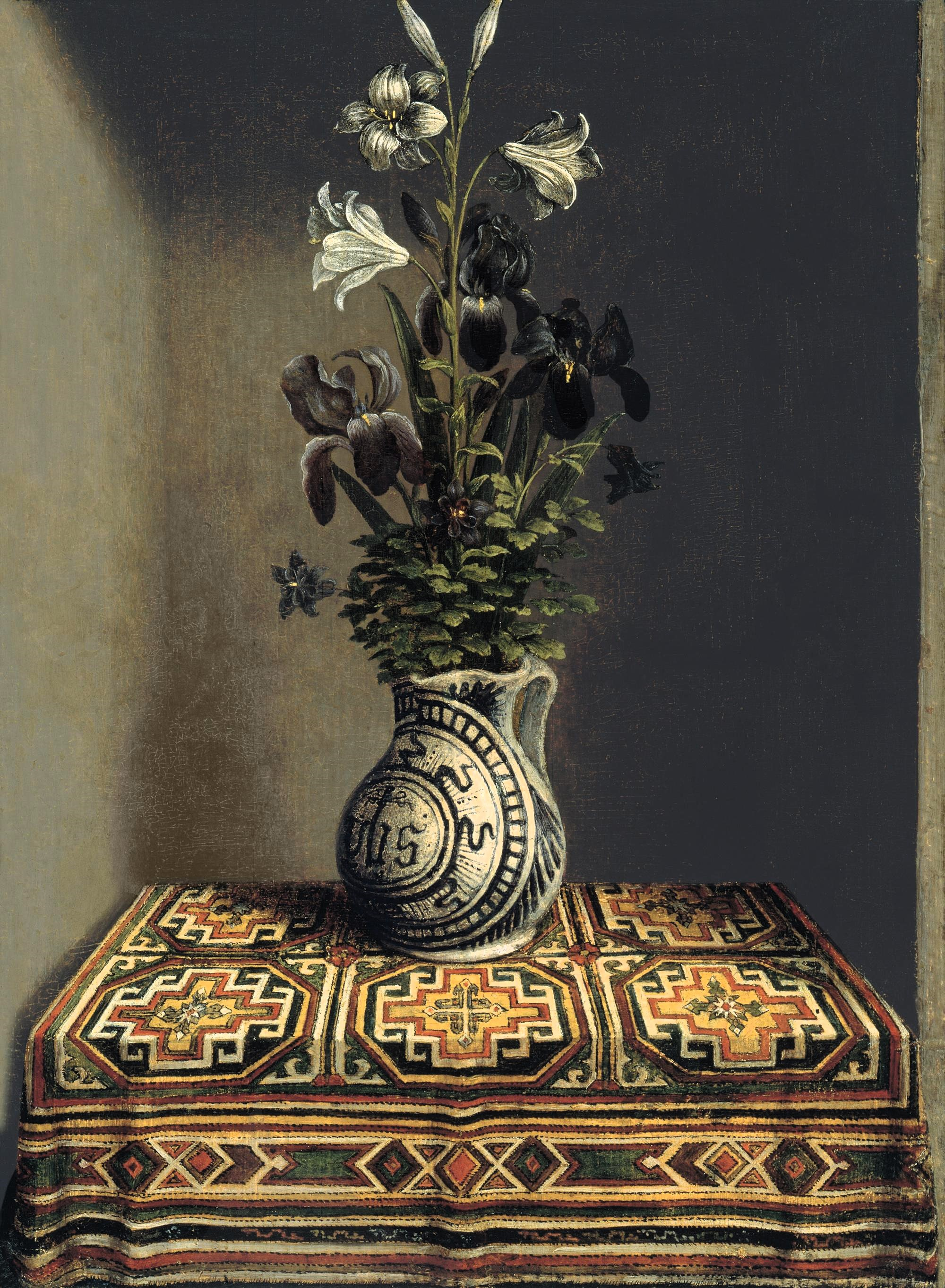
Flowers in a Jug, c. 1485-90, Thyssen-Bornemisza Museum

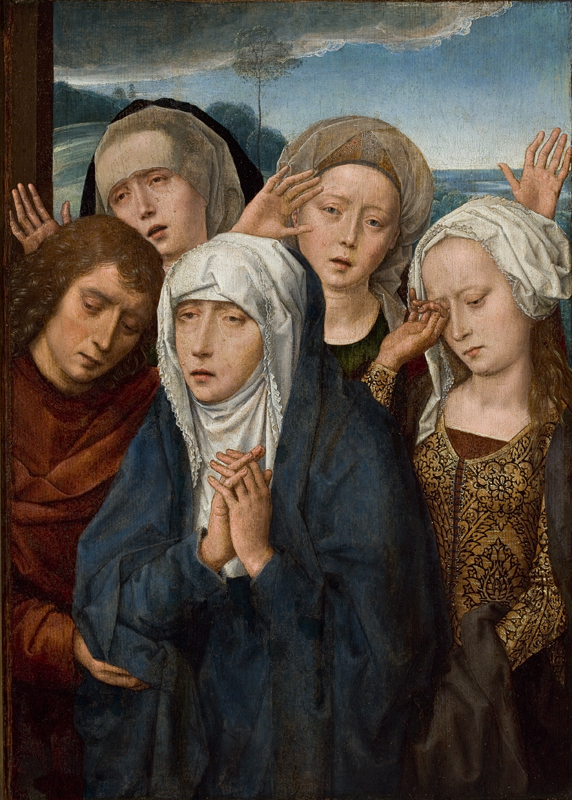
The Mourning Virgin with Saint John and the Pious Women from Galilee, c. 1485-90, São Paulo Museum of Art

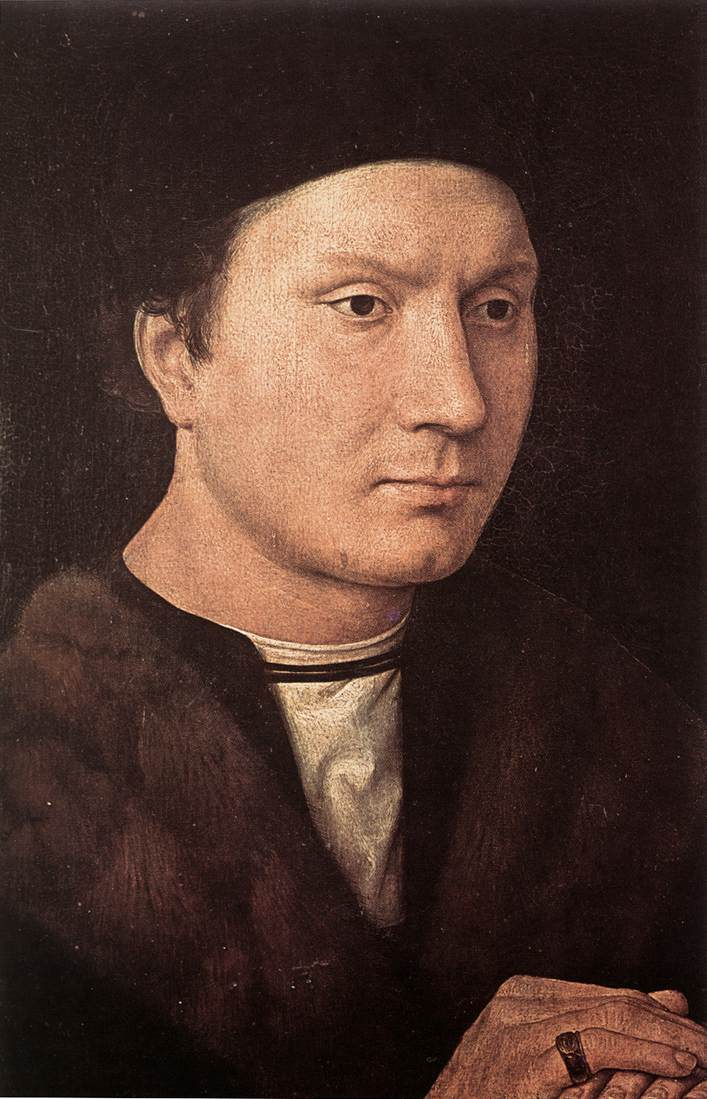
Portrait of Folco Portinari, c. 1490, Uffizi
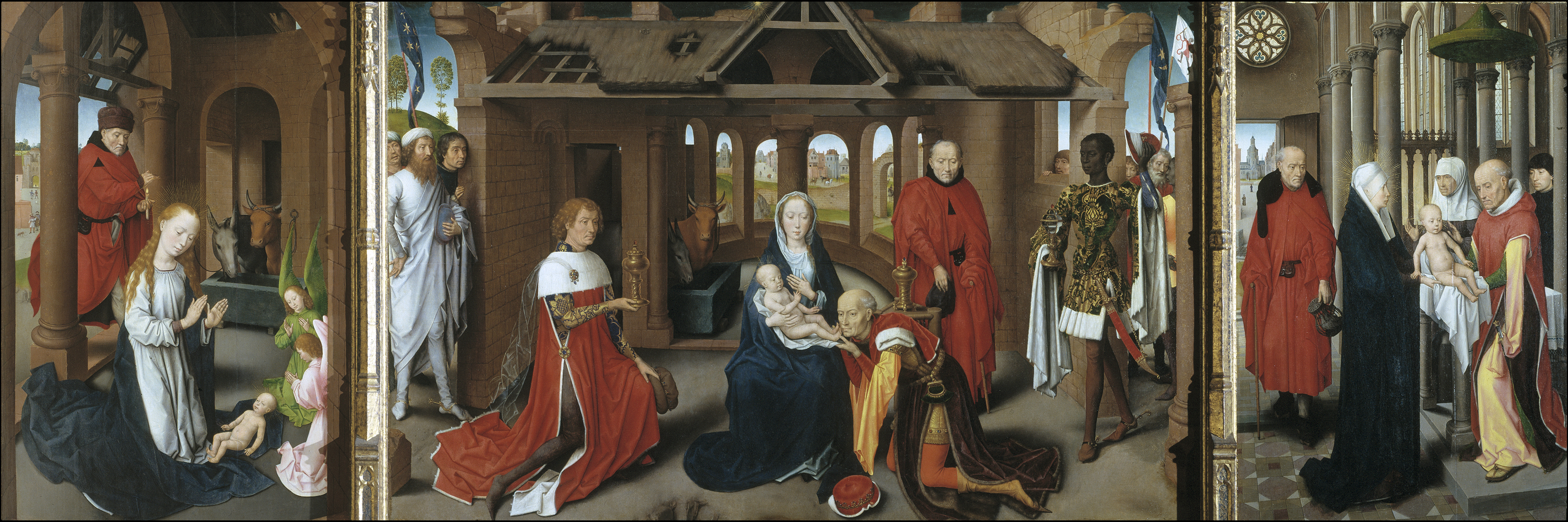
Adoration of the Magi Triptych, c. 1479-80, Museo del Prado

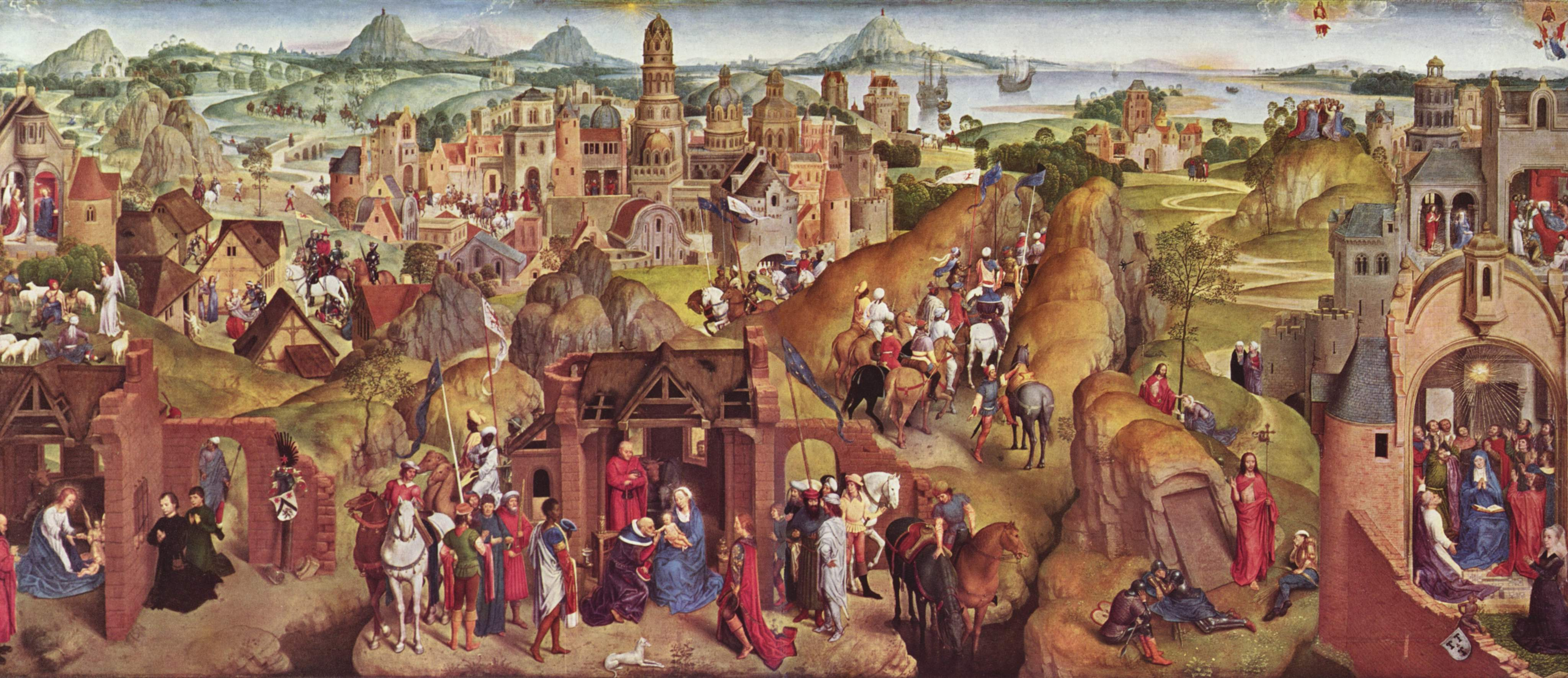
Seven Joys of the Virgin – a Life of the Virgin cycle on a single panel (1480). Altogether 25 scenes, not all involving the Virgin, are depicted, Alte Pinakothek

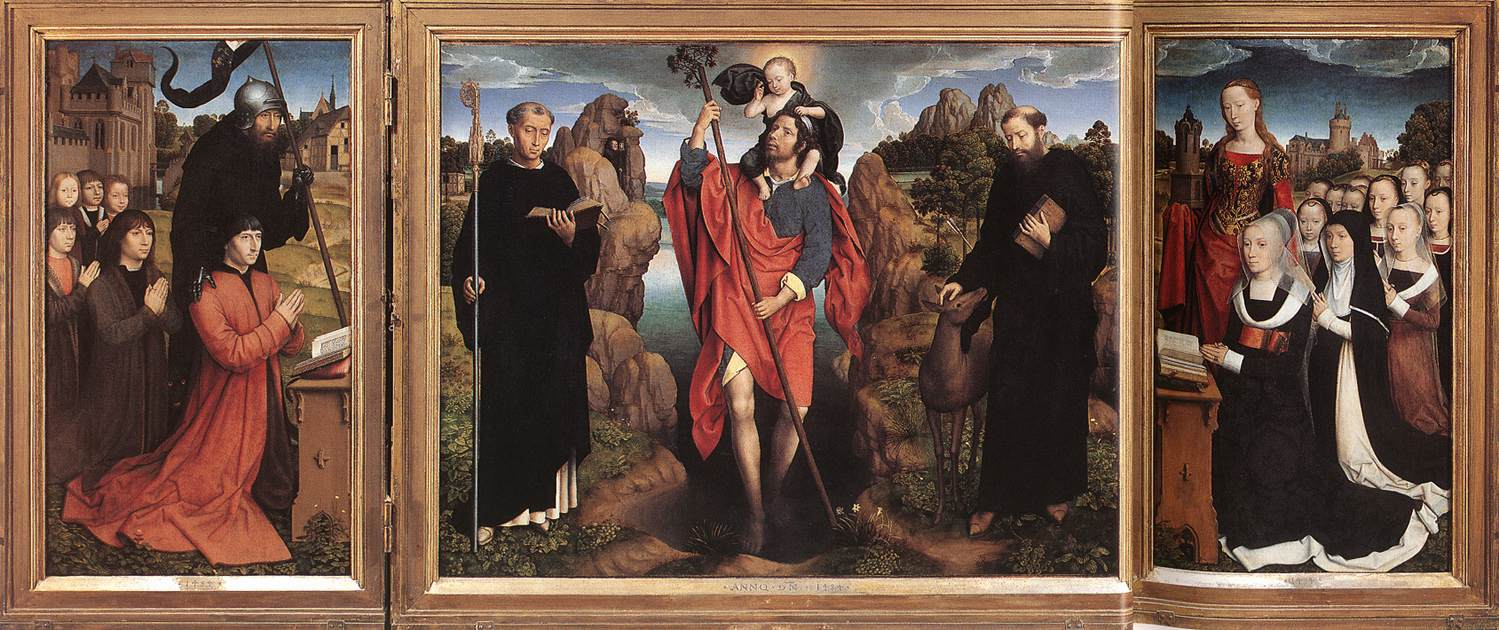
Moreel Triptych, 1484, Groeningemuseum

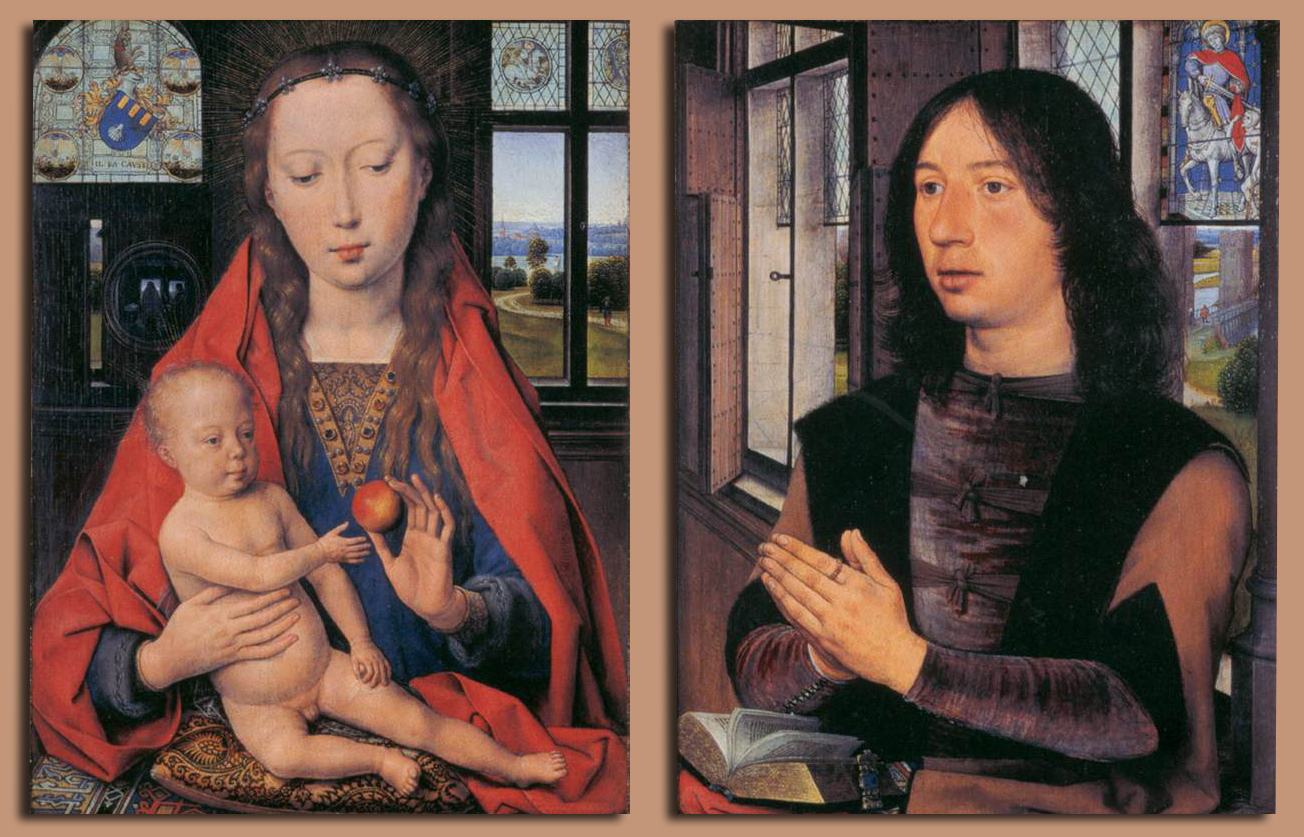
Diptych of Maarten van Nieuwenhove, 1487, Old St. John's Hospital, Bruges

== Memling carpets ==
There are four works by Memling that feature an oriental carpet. They are the triptych with the Virgin and Child Enthroned (Vienna, Kunsthistorisches Museum), the triptych of John Donne (London, National Gallery), the Virgin and Child Enthroned with a large family (Paris, Louvre), and the Flowers in a jug (Madrid, Thyssen-Bornemisza Museum). They all feature an indefinitely repeated pattern that is representative of an archaic strand of ornamentation in Turkoman carpets from Anatolia and Armenia. This type of carpet is named after Memling and is known as Memling carpets. They are characterized by guls with "hooked" lines radiating from a central body.

== References and sources ==
Sources

- Borchert, Till-Holger (2005). Memling's Portraits. Thames & Hudson. ISBN 0-500-09326-1.
- Batari, Ferenc (1994). The "Memling" carpets in de Vos, Dirk, editor (1994). Essays Hans Memling. Essay bundle published with the catalogue of the exhibit Hans Memling, vijf eeuwen werkelijkheid en fictie in the Groeningen Museum, Brugge 12 August – 15 November 1994.
