= Old St. John's Hospital =

Medieval hospital in Bruges, Belgium

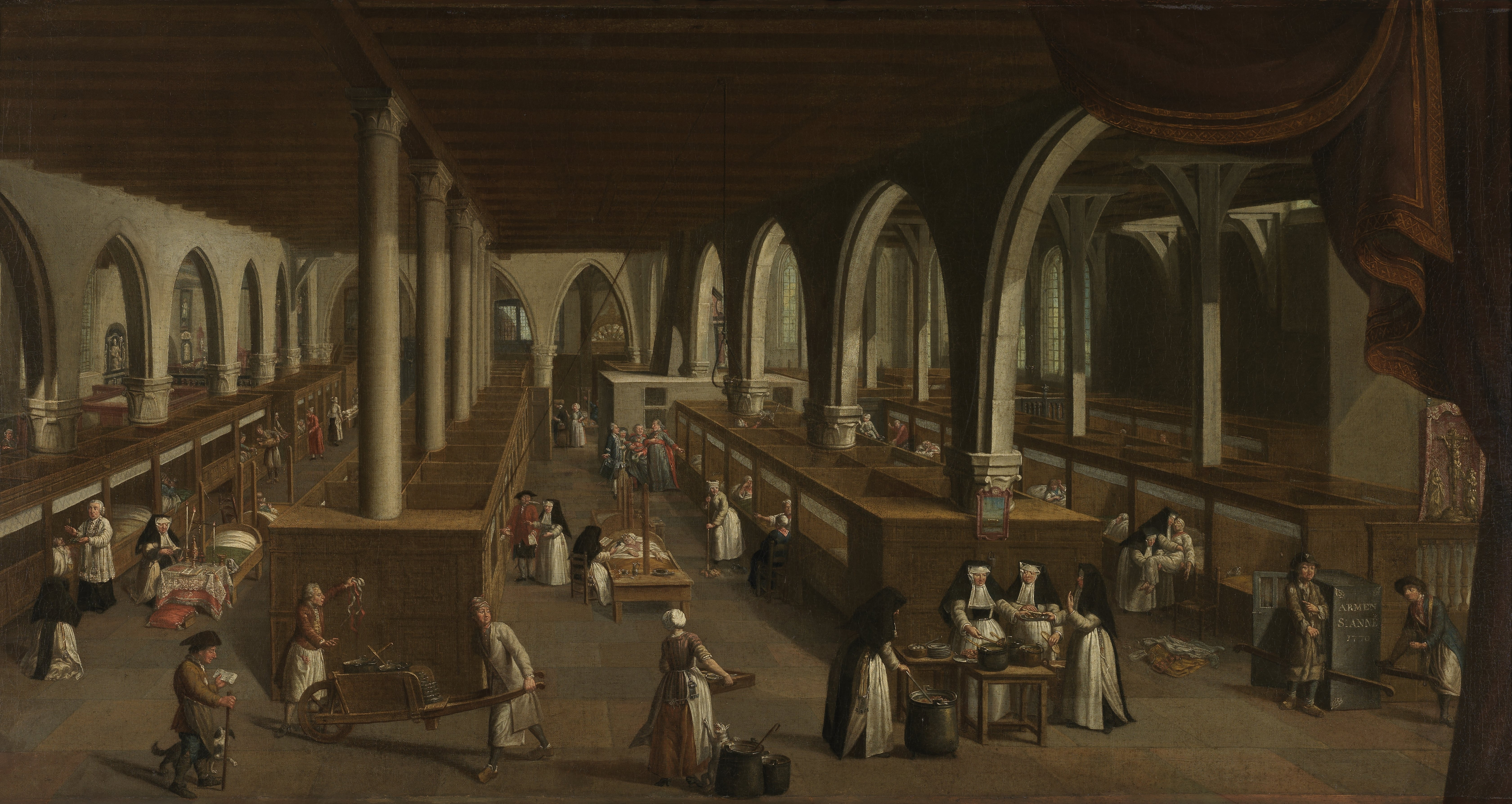
- St. John's Hospital in 1778

Geography
- Coordinates: 51.204°N 3.224°E

History
- Opened: Mid-12th century
- Closed: 1977

The Hospital of St. John (Dutch: Sint-Janshospitaal) was a medieval hospital in Bruges, founded in the mid-12th century. Located next to the Church of Our Lady, the premises contain some of Europe's oldest surviving hospital buildings. The hospital grew during the Middle Ages as a place where sick pilgrims and travellers were cared for. The site was later expanded with the building of a monastery and convent. In the 19th century, further construction led to a hospital with eight wards around a central building.

The building was planned to be demolished for a new hospital in the 1860s; however, due to interest from proponents of the Gothic Revival movement, especially Englishmen in the city, the building was preserved with the new hospital built alongside the original building.

In 1977, the building ceased being a hospital, at which time its activities were moved to a modern hospital in Brugge Sint-Pieters. The city of Bruges took over the buildings. Today, part of the hospital complex holds the Hans Memling museum, named for the German-born Early Netherlandish painter, where a number of works, such as triptychs are displayed, as well as hospital records, medical instruments and other works of art.

On 13 April 2020, the square in the hospital was named after Eleonora Verbeke, an 18th-century nun at the hospital.
