= Portrait of a Lady (van der Weyden) =

c. 1460 painting by Rogier van der Weyden

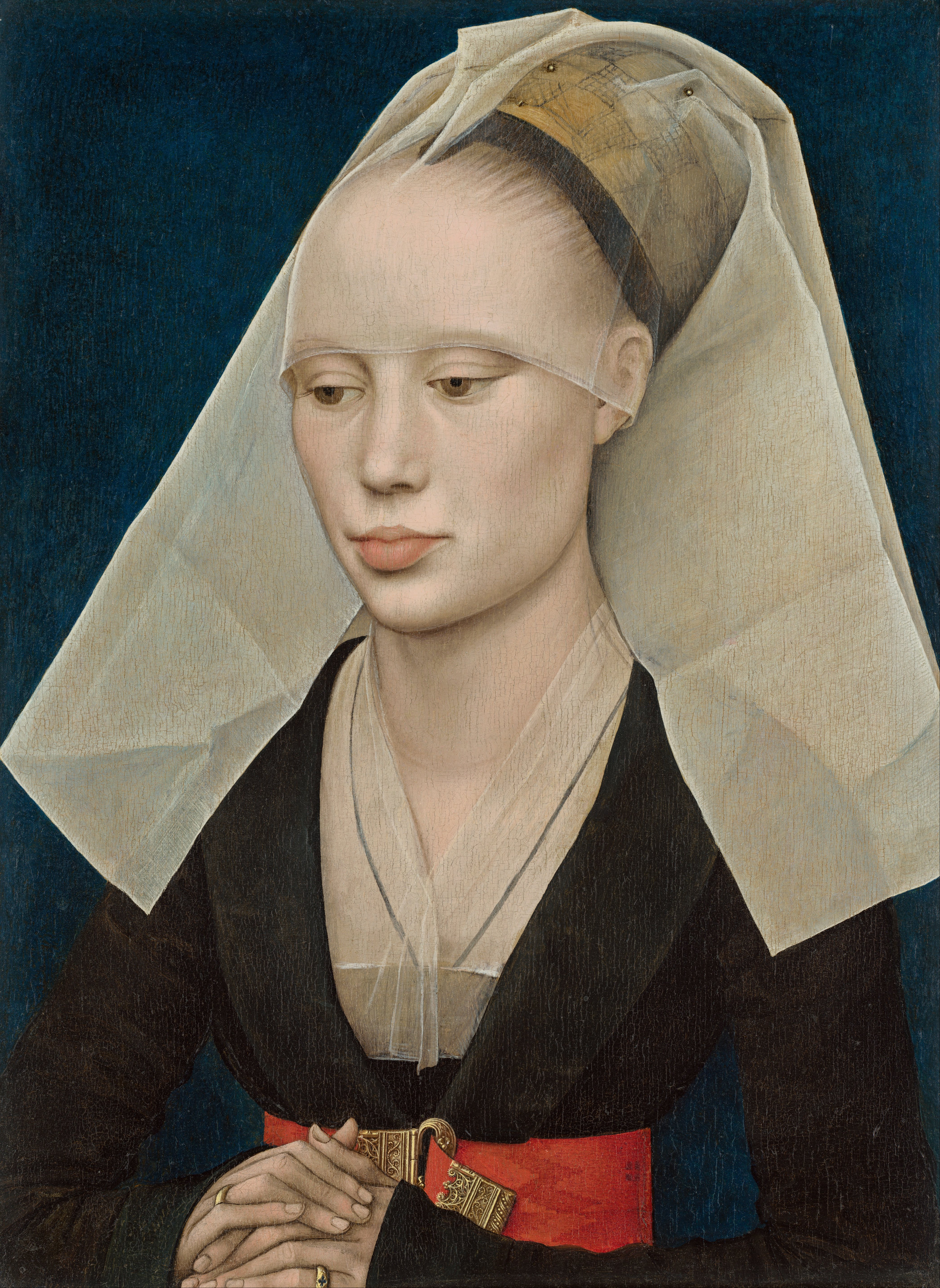
Rogier van der Weyden, Portrait of a Lady, c. 1460, National Gallery of Art, Washington, D.C. 34 × 25.5 cm (13 × 10 in)

Portrait of a Lady (or Portrait of a Woman) is a small oil-on-oak panel painting executed around 1460 by the Netherlandish painter Rogier van der Weyden. The composition is built from the geometric shapes that form the lines of the woman's veil, neckline, face, and arms, and by the fall of the light that illuminates her face and headdress. The vivid contrasts of darkness and light enhance the almost unnatural beauty and Gothic elegance of the model.

Van der Weyden was preoccupied by commissioned portraiture towards the end of his life and was highly regarded by later generations of painters for his penetrating evocations of character. In this work, the woman's humility and reserved demeanour are conveyed through her fragile physique, lowered eyes and tightly grasped fingers. She is slender and depicted according to the Gothic ideal of elongated features, indicated by her narrow shoulders, tightly pinned hair, high forehead and the elaborate frame set by the headdress. It is the only known portrait of a woman accepted as an autograph work by van der Weyden, yet the sitter's name is not recorded and he did not title the work.

Although van der Weyden did not adhere to the conventions of idealisation, he generally sought to flatter his sitters. He depicted his models in highly fashionable clothing, often with rounded—almost sculpted—facial features, some of which deviated from natural representation. He adapted his own aesthetic, and his portraits of women often bear a striking resemblance to each other.

The painting has been in the National Gallery of Art in Washington, D.C. since its donation in 1937, and is no. 34 in the de Vos catalogue raisonné of the artist. It has been described as "famous among all portraits of women of all schools".

== Composition ==
The woman, who is probably in her late teens or early twenties, is shown half-length and in three-quarters profile, set against a two-dimensional interior background of deep blue-green. The background is flat and lacks the attention to detail common in van der Weyden's devotional works. Like his contemporary Jan van Eyck (c. 1395 – 1441), when working in portraiture, he used dark planes to focus attention on the sitter. It was not until Hans Memling (c. 1435–1494), a pupil of van der Weyden, that a Netherlandish artist set a portrait against an exterior or landscape. In this work the flat setting allows the viewer to settle on the woman's face and quiet self-possession. Van der Weyden reduces his focus to four basic features: the woman's headdress, dress, face and hands. The background has darkened with age; it is likely that the angles created by the sitter's hennin and dress were once much sharper.

Petrus Christus (c. 1410/1420–1475/1476), Portrait of a Female Donor c. 1455, National Gallery of Art, Washington. Christus' work was highly influential on van der Weyden as can be seen in the expression and colouring.

The woman wears an elegant low-cut black dress with dark bands of fur at the neck and wrist. Her clothes are of the then-fashionable Burgundian style, which emphasises the tall and thin aesthetic of the Gothic ideal. (Note: Van der Weyden often worked on commission from members of the Burgundian court. See Schneider, 40) Her dress is buckled by a bright red sash pulled in below her breasts. The buff-coloured hennin headdress is draped with a large transparent veil, which spills over her shoulders, reaching her upper arms. Van der Weyden's attention to the structure of the clothing—the careful detailing of the pins pushed into the veil to fix its position—is typical for the artist.

The woman's veil forms a diamond shape, balanced by the inverse flow of a light vest worn beneath her dress. She is shown at a slight angle, but her pose is centred by the interlocked broad lines of arms, décolletage and veil. The woman's head is delicately lit, leaving no strong tonal contrasts on her skin. She has a long, thin face, plucked eyebrows and eyelids, and a plucked hairline to create a fashionably high forehead. (Note: A plucked hairline was also the fashion in Renaissance Italy at the time.) Her hair is tightly pinned back on the rim of the bonnet and rests above her ear. Her high headdress and severe hairline accentuate her elongated face, giving it a sculpted appearance.

The woman's left ear is set, according to art historian Norbert Schneider, unnaturally high and far back, parallel to her eyes rather than to her nose; this position is probably an artistic device used to continue the flow of the diagonal line of the veil's inner-right wing. In the 15th century, veils were normally worn for modesty, to hide the sensuality of the flesh. In this work the veil has the opposite effect; the woman's face is framed by the headdress to draw attention to her beauty.

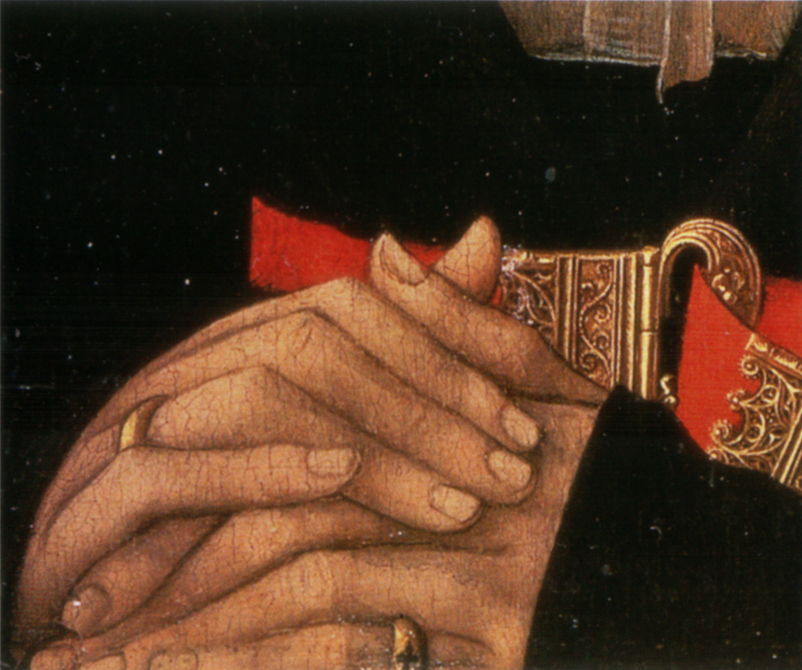
Crop of the Washington portrait showing the woman's tightly crossed fingers and red belt

The woman's hands are crossed tightly as if in prayer, and positioned so low in the painting as to appear to be resting on the frame. They are rendered as tightly compressed into a small area of the picture; it is likely van der Weyden did not want them to result in an area of high tone that might distract from the description of her head. Her slender fingers are minutely detailed; van der Weyden often indicated the social position of his models through his rendering of their face and hands. The sleeve of her dress extends beyond her wrists. Her fingers are folded in layers; their intricate portrayal is the most detailed element in the painting, and echoes the pyramidal form of the upper portion of the painting.

Her eyes gaze downward in humility, in contrast to her relatively extravagant clothes. The piety of her expression is achieved through motifs common to van der Weyden's work. Her eyes and nose are elongated and her lower lip made fuller by the use of tone and pronounced finish. Some vertical lines around these features are emphasised, while her pupils are enlarged and her eyebrows slightly raised. In addition the contours of her face are highlighted in a manner that is slightly unnatural and abstract, and outside the usual spatial constraints of 15th-century human representation. This methodology was described by art historian Erwin Panofsky: "Rogier concentrated on certain salient features—salient both from a physiognomical and psychological point of view—which he expressed primarily by lines." Her high forehead and full mouth have been seen as suggestive of a nature at once intellectual, ascetic, and passionate, symbolic of "an unresolved conflict in her personality". Panofsky refers to a "smouldering excitability".

The sitter is unknown, although some art historians have speculated on her identity. On the grounds of similarity of facial features, writer Wilhelm Stein suggested in the early 20th century that she might be Marie de Valengin, the illegitimate daughter of Philip the Good of Burgundy. (Note: Philip the Good commissioned a portrait from Van der Weyden around 1450) However, this is a contentious assertion and not widely held. Because her hands are shown as resting on the painting's lower frame, art historians generally accept that this was an independent portrait, rather than a devotional work. It is possible that it was intended as a pendant to a picture of the woman's husband, however no other portrait has been suggested as a likely companion.

== Break from idealisation ==
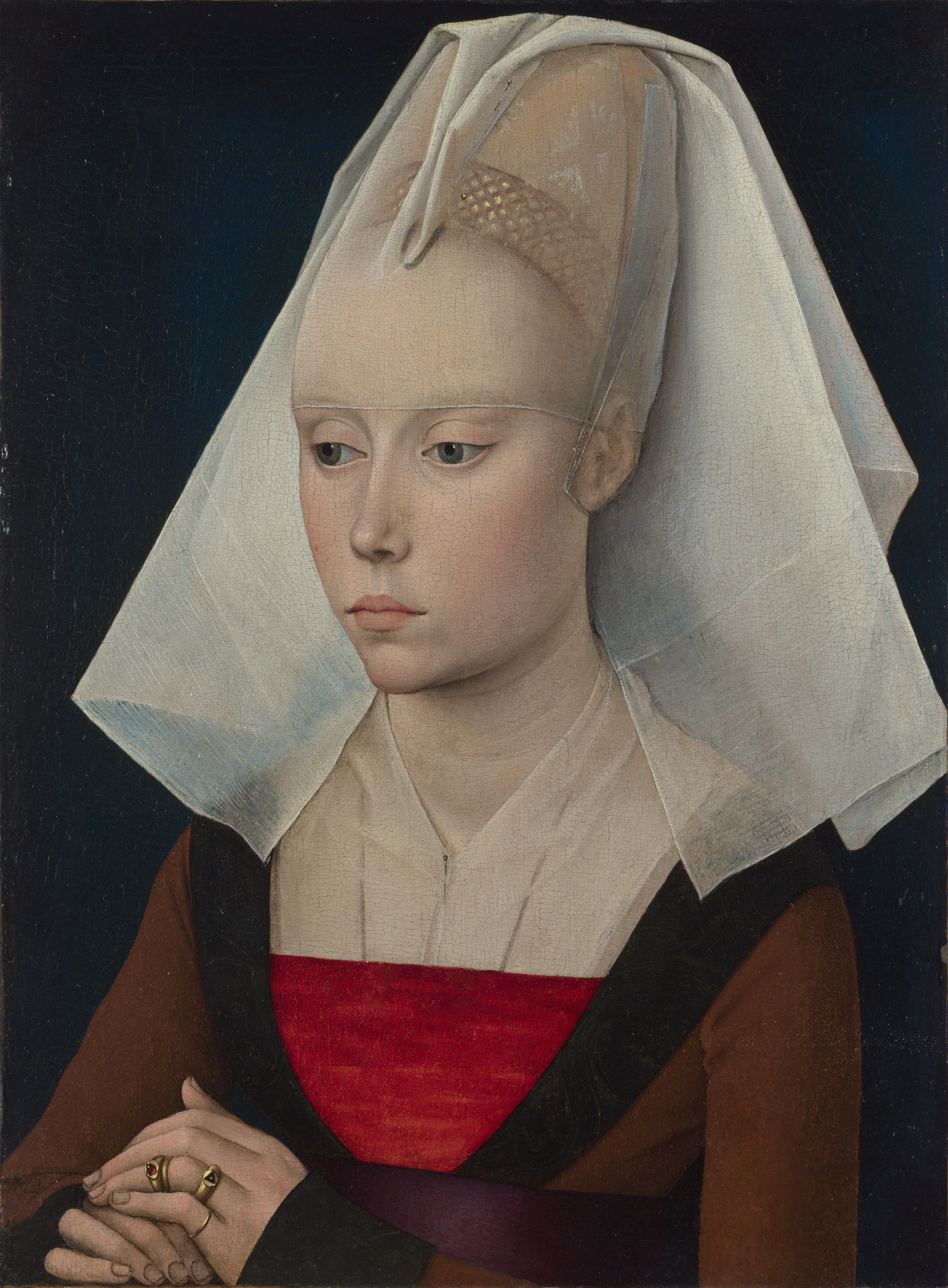
Workshop of Rogier van der Weyden, Portrait of a Lady, c. 1460. National Gallery, London. This similar painting is much less detailed and comes from his workshop. It may date from as late as 1466.

Van der Weyden worked in the same tradition of portraiture as contemporaries Jan van Eyck (Note: While van der Weyden would have seen van Eyck's work, it is not known if the two met. Van Eyck died in 1441) and Robert Campin. (Note: He was apprenticed to Campin in 1426. See Friedlænder, 16) In the early to middle 15th century, these three artists were among the first generation of "Northern Renaissance" painters, and the first northern Europeans to portray members of the middle and upper classes naturalistically rather than in a medieval Christian idealised form. In earlier Netherlandish art the profile view was the dominant mode of representation for the nobles or clergy worthy of portraiture. In works such as Portrait of a Man in a Turban (1433), Jan van Eyck broke this tradition and used the three-quarter profile of the face which became the standard in Netherlandish art. Here, van der Weyden utilises the same profile, which better allows him to describe the shape of the head and facial features of the sitter. She is shown in half-length, which enables the artist to show her hands crossed at her waist.

Despite this new freedom, van der Weyden's portraits of women are strikingly similar in concept and structure, both to each other and to female portraits by Campin. (Note: The similarity between van der Weyden and Campion's female portraits is so strong that they were sometimes misattributed. See Campbell, 19) Most are three-quarter face and half-length. They typically set their models in front of a dark background that is uniform and nondescript. While the portraits are noted for their expressive pathos, the facial features of the women strongly resemble one another. This indicates that although van der Weyden did not adhere to the tradition of idealised representation, he sought to please his sitters in a manner that reflected contemporary ideals of beauty. Most of van der Weyden's portraits were painted as commissions from the nobility; he painted only five (including Portrait of a Lady) that were not donor portraits. (Note: Portraits were at the time a common means of initiating marriage alliances. Christus, van Eyck and van der Weyden were known to have been employed for this reason. In particular, the extent and level of detail that Christus and van der Weyden undertook to make their subjects appear attractive suggest this was often a primary motive. See Wilson, 47–48) It is known that in his Portrait of Philip de Croÿ (c. 1460), van der Weyden complimented the young Flemish nobleman by concealing his large nose and undershot jaw. When describing this tendency in relation to the Washington portrait, art historian Norbert Schneider wrote, "While van Eyck shows nature 'in the raw', as it were, Rogier improves on physical reality, civilising and refining Nature and the human form with the help of a brush." The high quality of the painting is highlighted when compared to the National Gallery's very similar workshop painting. The London sitter has softer, more rounded features and is younger and less individually characterised than the c. 1460 model. The technique also is less subtle and fine in the London work. However, both share a similar expressions and dress.

Van der Weyden was more concerned with the aesthetic and emotional response created by the pictures overall than in the specific portraits. Art historian and curator Lorne Campbell suggests that the popularity of the portrait is due more to the "elegant simplicity of the pattern which [the sitter] creates" than to the grace of her depiction. While van der Weyden did not stay within the traditional realms of idealisation, he created his own aesthetic, which he extended across his portraits and religious pictures. This aesthetic includes the mood of sorrowful devotion which forms the dominant tone in all his portraits. His figures may be more natural than those of earlier generations of artists; however, his individualistic approach to the depiction of his sitters' piety often leads to the abandonment of the rules of scale.

John Walker, former director of the National Gallery of Art, referred to the subject as "outré", but believed that despite the awkwardness of her individual features, the model was nonetheless "strangely beautiful". By the time of the work's completion van der Weyden had eclipsed even van Eyck in popularity, and this painting is typical of the austere spirituality, over the latter's sensuality, for which van der Weyden is renowned.

== Condition and provenance ==
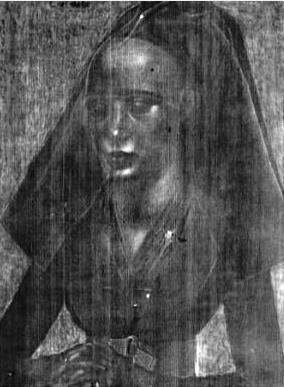
This 1937 radiograph shows that the woman's waist was at first narrower while her breasts were more pronounced.

Although van der Weyden did not title the work, and the sitter's name is not recorded in any of the early inventories, the style of her dress has been used to place the picture very late in van der Weyden's career. The c. 1460 dating is based on the high-fashion dress and the work's apparent chronological position in the evolution of van der Weyden's style. However, it is possible that it was executed even later (van der Weyden died in 1464).

Portrait of a Lady was painted on a single oak board with a vertical grain and has an unpainted margin on each side. The panel was prepared with gesso, upon which the figure was then painted in monochrome. Glazes of oil pigment were then added, which allowed for subtle and transparent tonal gradations. Infra-red reflectography reveals that van der Weyden did not sketch the work on the board before he began to paint, and there is no evidence of underdrawing. It shows that the lady was portrayed as more slender before changes were made as the work progressed; thickly applied background paint underlies some of the belt, demonstrating that the original silhouette was widened. These changes are also visible in x-ray images. It is in relatively good condition, having been cleaned a number of times, most recently in 1980. There is some loss of paint on the veil, headdress and sleeve, and abrasion on the ear.

The provenance of the painting is unclear, and there is doubt as to which painting is referred to in some early inventories. An Anhalt prince, likely Leopold Friedrich Franz (d. 1817) of Wörlitz, near Dessau, Germany, held it in the early 19th century, (Note: Portraits in the Anhalt collection were generally poorly catalogued in early inventories) after which it is likely to have passed to Leopold Friedrich (d. 1871). The painting was loaned for exhibition in 1902, when it was shown at the Hôtel de Gouvernement Provincial, Bruges at the Exposition des primitifs flamands et d'art ancien. It was held by a Duke of Anhalt until 1926 when he sold it to the art dealers Duveen Brothers. They in turn sold it that year to Andrew W. Mellon. It was loaned the following year to the Royal Academy of Arts, London, for an exhibition covering six centuries of Flemish and Belgian art. Mellon willed the work to his Educational and Charitable Trust in 1932, which in 1937 donated it to the National Gallery of Art where it is on permanent display.

== Gallery ==
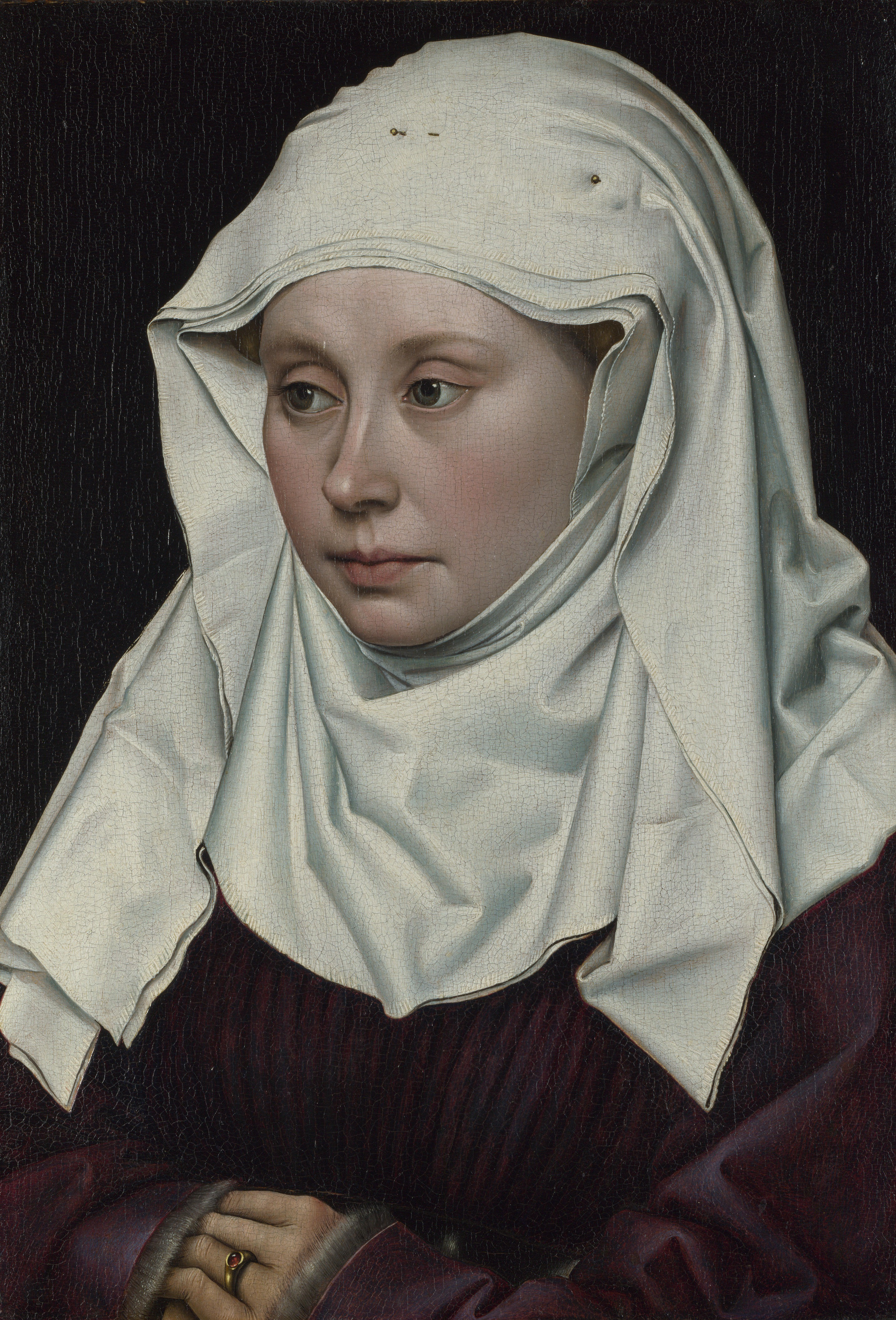
Robert Campin (c. 1375 – 1444), Portrait of a Young Woman, 1430–1435, National Gallery, London. Van der Weyden's style was founded on the work of the older master.

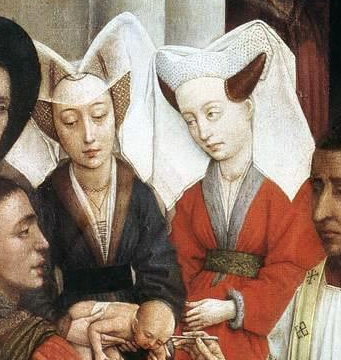
Rogier van der Weyden, Seven Sacraments Altarpiece, detail, 1445–1450, Koninklijk Museum voor Schone Kunsten, Antwerp. This formal, group work shows high-ranking women dressed in the contemporary fashion of high—here divided—hennin and v shaped neck-lines.

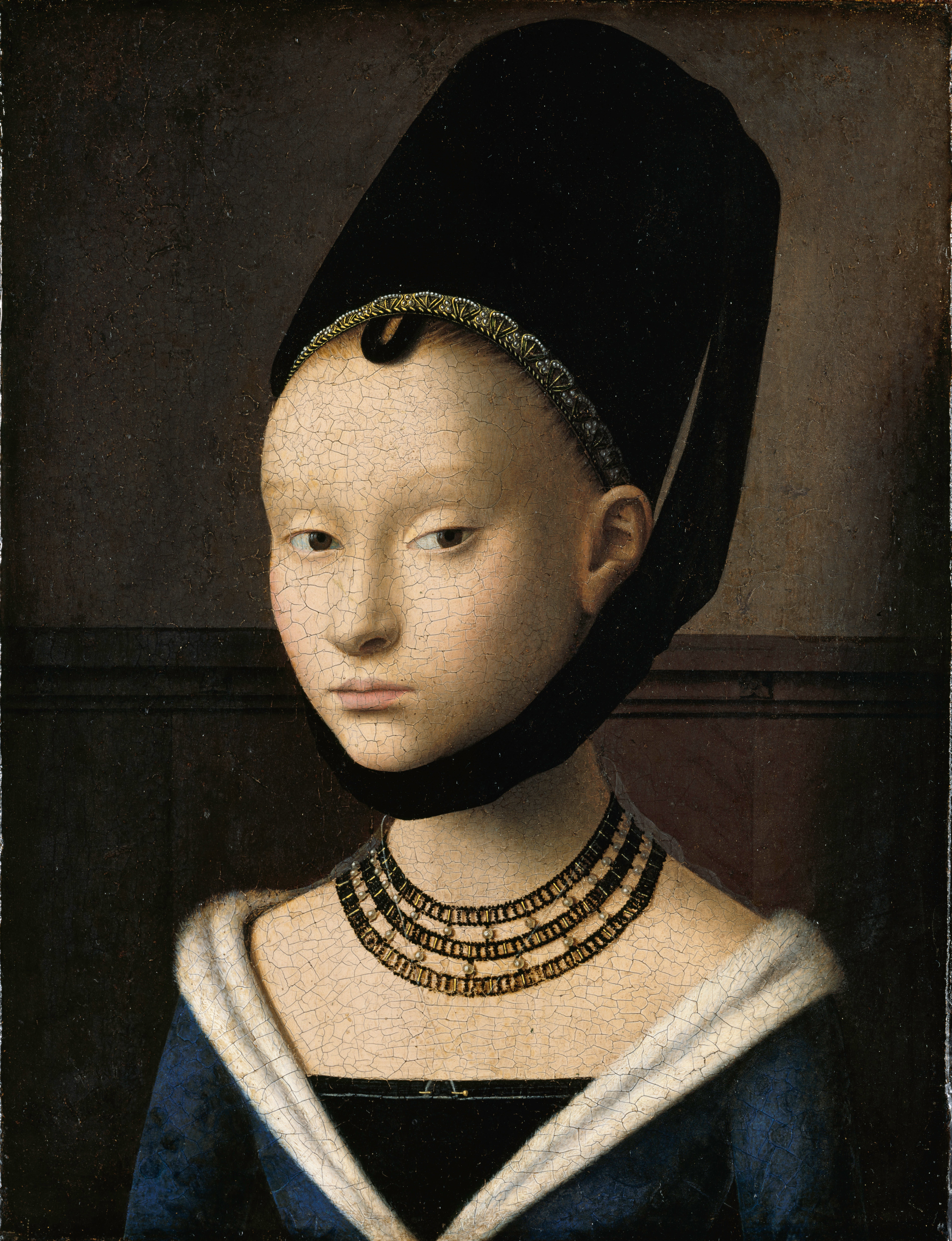
Petrus Christus' Portrait of a Young Girl, after 1460, Berlin State Museums. Similarity can be seen in the sculpted features and expression of the model.

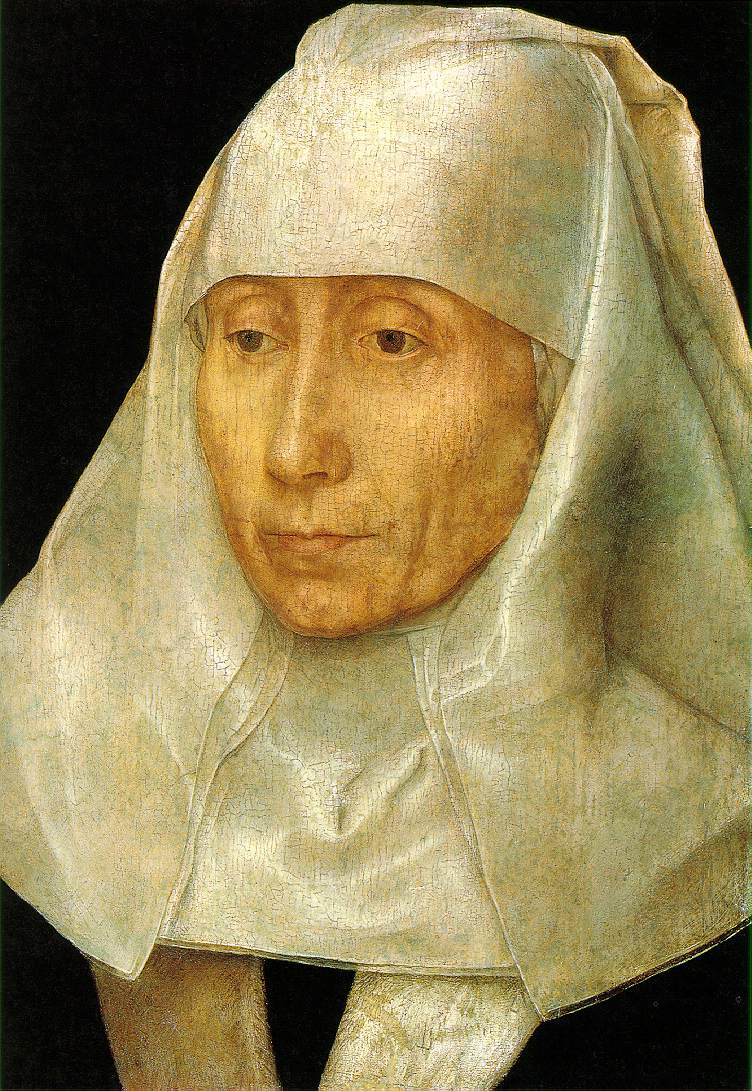
Hans Memling, Portrait of an Elderly Woman c. 1470. Museum of Fine Arts, Houston, Texas. Memling was a follower of van der Weyden and utilised his distortion of natural representation to depict ideals of beauty.

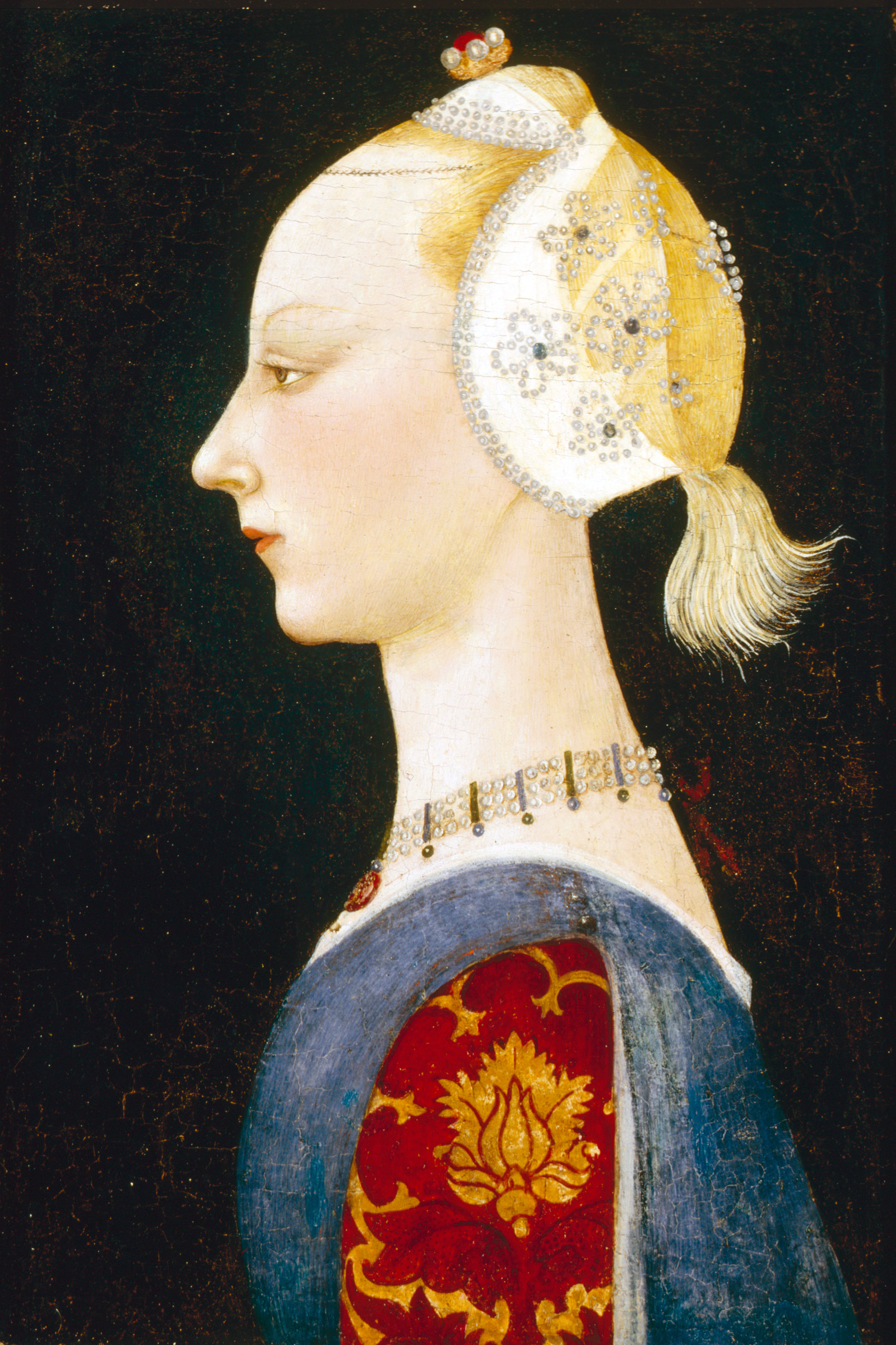
A Young Lady of Fashion is attributed to the Florentine painter and mathematician Paolo Uccello and dates early 1460s. The young lady has plucked her hairline to increase the expanse, and thus elegance, of her forehead, and a lock of hair falls at the back in a ponytail. A tight-fitting cap covers her ears, a fashion possibly due to the prevalent belief of the time that the Virgin Mary conceived through the ear.

== See also ==
- 1400–1500 in fashion
