= Edward Grimston (diplomat) =

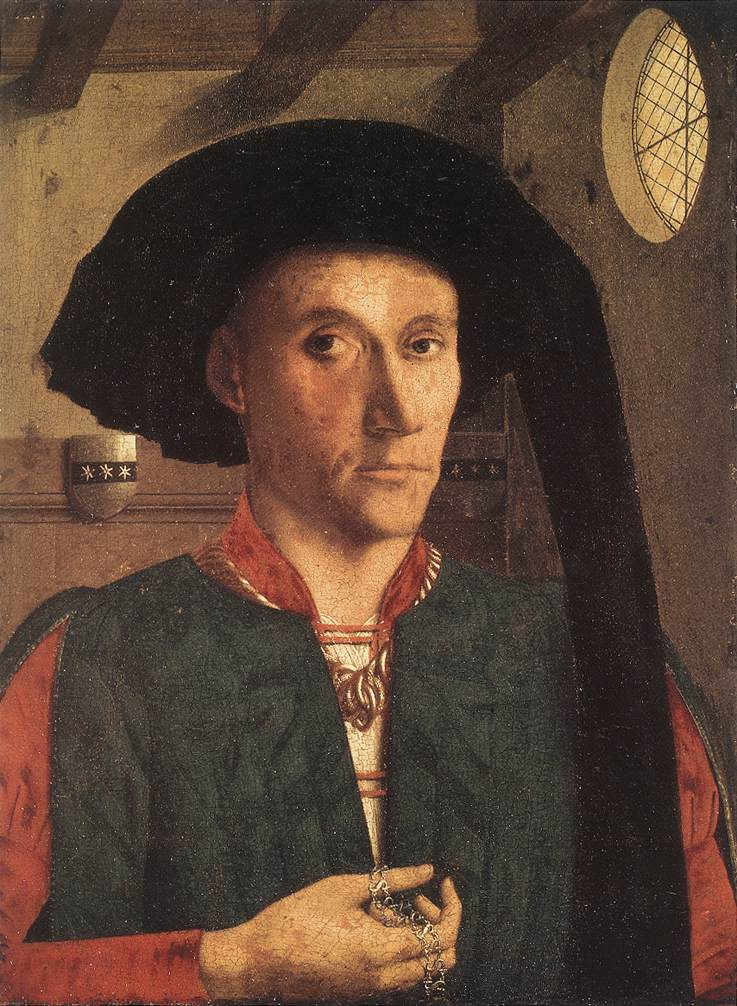
Portrait of Edward Grimston (1446) by Petrus Christus. National Gallery, London

Edward Grimston or Grymeston (died 1478) was the son of Robert Grimston, who lived in Grimston, East Riding of Yorkshire, and a daughter of Sir Anthony Spilman of Suffolk. Edward was a diplomat in the service of Henry VI of England and was the ambassador of England at the court of Philip the Good, the Duke of Burgundy. In 1446, when he travelled to Calais and Brussels, he was painted by Petrus Christus, an Early Netherlandish painter active in Bruges.

== Career ==
Grimston was active at the courts of Burgundy and France throughout the latter half of the 1440s. He ended his public career in 1451. His first wife died sometime before 1456, after which he married Mary Drury of Suffolk, daughter of Sir William Drury and through her mother, a great-granddaughter of Katherine Swynford. They had five sons and three daughters. At some time he lived in Eye, Suffolk. After Mary Drury died in 1469, Grimston married for the third time to Philippa, the widow of Lord Roos.

Edward Grimston died in 1478 and is buried in the church of Thorndon, Suffolk next to his second wife Mary. His portrait has remained in the hands of his descendants the Earls of Verulam, currently John Grimston, 7th Earl of Verulam, but is on long-term loan to the National Gallery in London.
