= Isabella of Portugal with Saint Elizabeth =

Painting by Petrus Christus

Isabel of Portugal with Saint Elizabeth
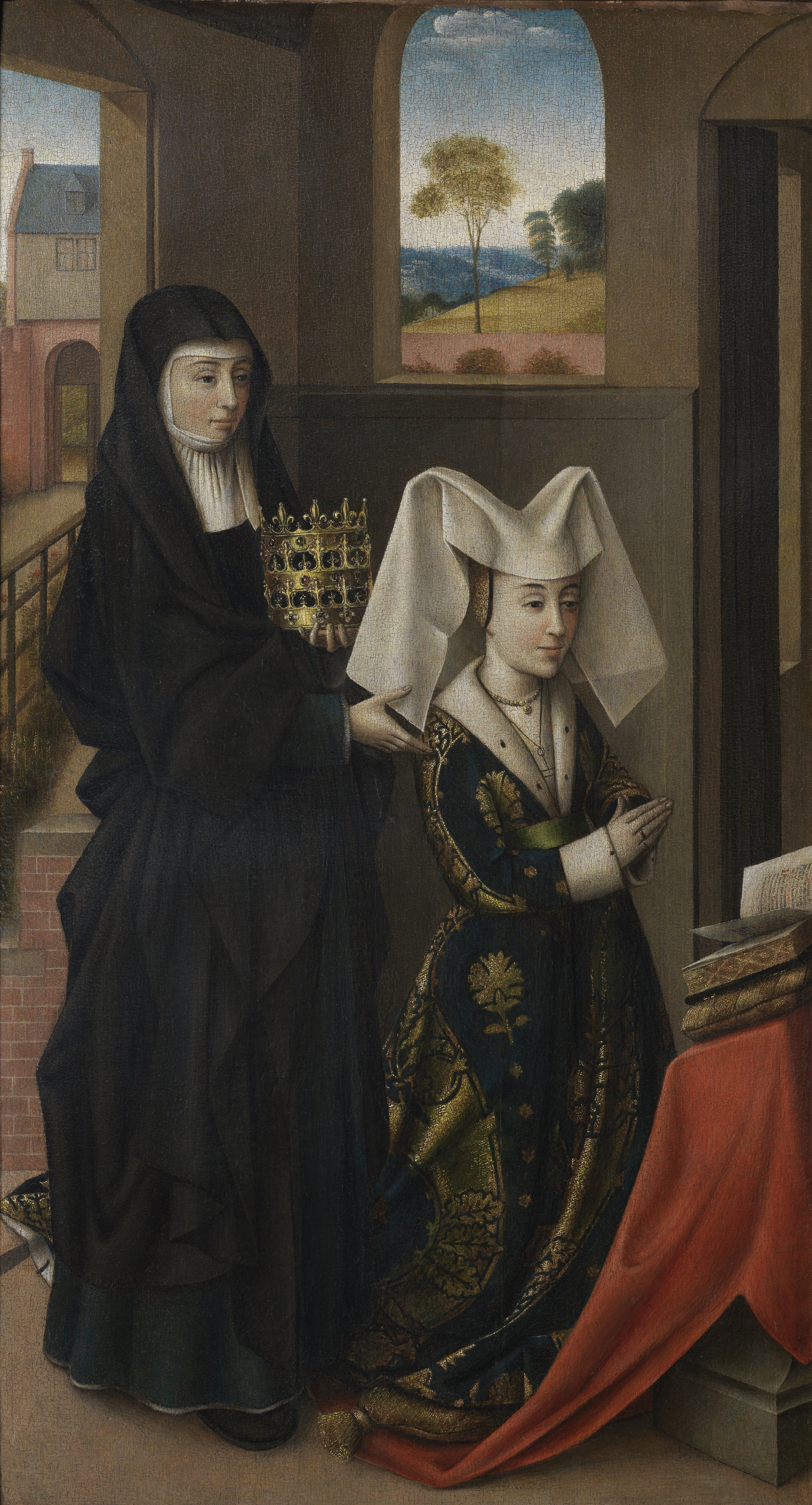
- Artist: Petrus Christus
- Year: c. 1457–60
- Type: Oil-on-oak panel
- Dimensions: 58.7 cm × 32.9 cm (23.1 in × 13.0 in)
- Location: Groeningemuseum, Bruges, Belgium
- Accession: 0000.GRO1614.I

Isabella of Portugal with Saint Elizabeth (or Saint Elizabeth presenting Isabella of Portugal or Saint Elizabeth and a donor) is a c. 1457–1460 oil-on-oak panel painting by the Early Netherlandish artist Petrus Christus. Originally the left-hand wing of a now lost triptych, the panel shows Isabella of Portugal, Duchess of Burgundy (1397—1471) kneeling in prayer. She is attended by her patron saint and protector Elizabeth of Hungary (d. 1231), who is dressed as a nun and holds the three gold crowns that traditionally symbolise her piety and royal birth.

Isabella of Portugal may have commissioned the triptych before she retired in 1457 to Nieppe in France. Although the panel is almost certainly a donor portrait, her facial features cannot be definitely attributed to her. She would have interacted with Christus – both were members of the confraternity of Our Lady of the Dry Tree.

The panel was once owned by Isabella's great-granddaughter Margaret of Austria, and is now in the collection of the Groeningemuseum in Bruges, Belgium. It was fully attributed to Christus in the 1960s.

== Description ==
The oil painting is on oak and shows Isabella presented by her patron saint Elizabeth of Thuringia. It was originally the left-hand panel of a dismantled triptych whoes center panel consisted of a now lost Pietà with Our Lady of Sorrows (Mater dolorosa), while the right-hand wing showed St. Catherine of Alexandria and is now in a private collection.

Isabella wears a hennin headdress and has closed eyes and doll-like features. Her dress is lined with fur and its rendering has been described as influence by Jan van Eyck. She is assisted by St. Elizabeth, a Hungarian queen (also known as Elisabeth of Thuringia) known giving over her own money to the sick and dying during the 1226 famine that devastated Thuringia, where she lived at the time. Elizabeth was expelled after her husband's death and entered the Order of Saint Francis. It is said of Elizabeth that she deserved three crowns because, as a virgin and as a wife and widow, she radiated holiness.

The reverse contains traces of a grisaille showing the archangel Gabriell.

== Provenance ==
The panel was donated to Isabella's great-granddaughter Margaret of Austria by Catherine de Buisson, abbess of the Abbaye Sainte-Élisabeth du Quesnoy, France. It has been in the Groeningemuseum in Bruges, Belgium, since 1965.

== Sources ==
- Ainsworth, Maryan Petrus Christus in Renaissance Bruges: An Interdisciplinary Approach. New York: Metropolitan Museum of Art, 2002. ISBN 2-5035-0444-2
- Ainsworth, Maryan. "The Business of Art: Patrons, Clients and Art Markets". In: Maryan Ainsworth, et al. (eds.) From Van Eyck to Bruegel: Early Netherlandish Painting in the Metropolitan Museum of Art. New York: Metropolitan Museum of Art, 1998. ISBN 978-0-8709-9871-3
- Ainsworth, Maryan. Petrus Christus: Renaissance Master of Bruges. New York: Metropolitan Museum of Art, 1994. ISBN 0-8109-6482-1
- Borchert, Till-Holger. The Flemish Primitives in Bruges. Weefstraat (Ghent): Ludion, 2019. ISBN 978-9-4930-3911-7
- Boeckl, Christine. Images of Leprosy: Disease, Religion, and Politics in European Art. Penn State University Press, 2011. ISBN 978-0-2710-9124-2
- Koldeweij, Jos. "Reviewed Work(s): Petrus Christus: Renaissance Master of Bruges by Maryan W. Ainsworth". Simiolus: Netherlands Quarterly for the History of Art, volume 23, number 4, 1995. JSTOR 3780799
- Lane, Barbara. "Petrus Christus: A Reconstructed Triptych with an Italian Motif". Art Bulletin, volume 52, No. 4, December 1970. JSTOR 3048765
- Upton, Joel Morgan. Petrus Christus: His Place in Fifteenth-Century Flemish painting. University Park, PA: Pennsylvania State University Press, 1989. ISBN 0-2710-0672-2
