= Portrait of a Young Girl (Christus) =

Oil on oak painting by Petrus Christus

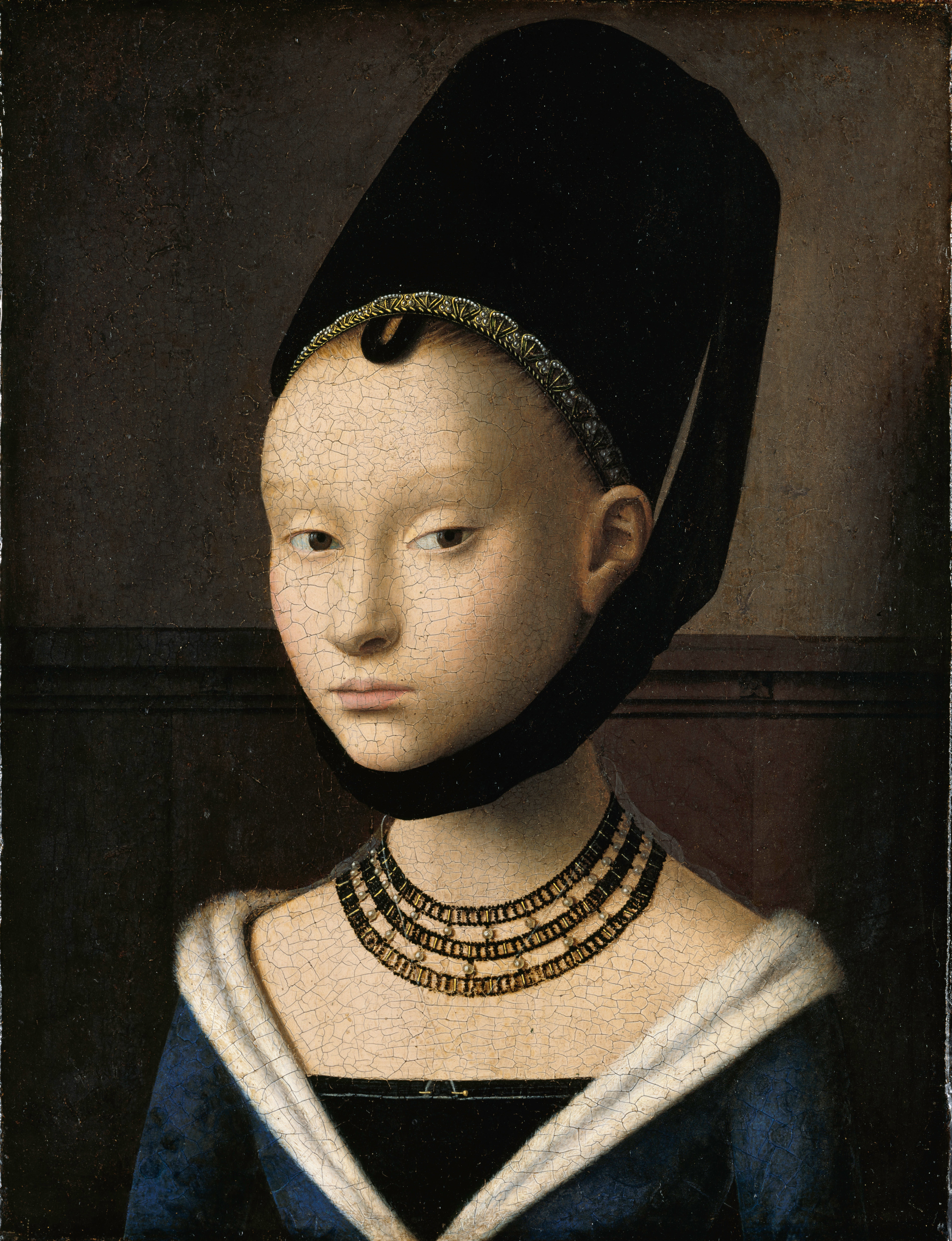
- Artist: Petrus Christus
- Year: c. 1465–70
- Type: Oil on oak panel
- Dimensions: 29 cm × 22.5 cm (11 in × 8.9 in)
- Location: Gemäldegalerie, Berlin

Portrait of a Young Girl is a small oil-on-oak panel painting by the Early Netherlandish painter Petrus Christus. It was completed towards the end of his life, between 1465 and 1470, and is held in the Gemäldegalerie, Berlin. It marks a major stylistic advance in contemporary portraiture; the girl is set in an airy, three-dimensional, realistic setting, and stares out at the viewer with a complicated expression that is reserved, yet intelligent and alert.

It is widely regarded as one of the most exquisite portraits of the Northern Renaissance. Art historian Joel Upton described the sitter as resembling "a polished pearl, almost opalescent, lying on a cushion of black velvet." The panel builds on the work of Jan van Eyck and Rogier van der Weyden, and was highly influential in the decades after its completion. Its appeal lies in part in her intriguing stare, accentuated by the slight misalignment of her eyes, while the eyebrows are faintly skewed.

== Description ==
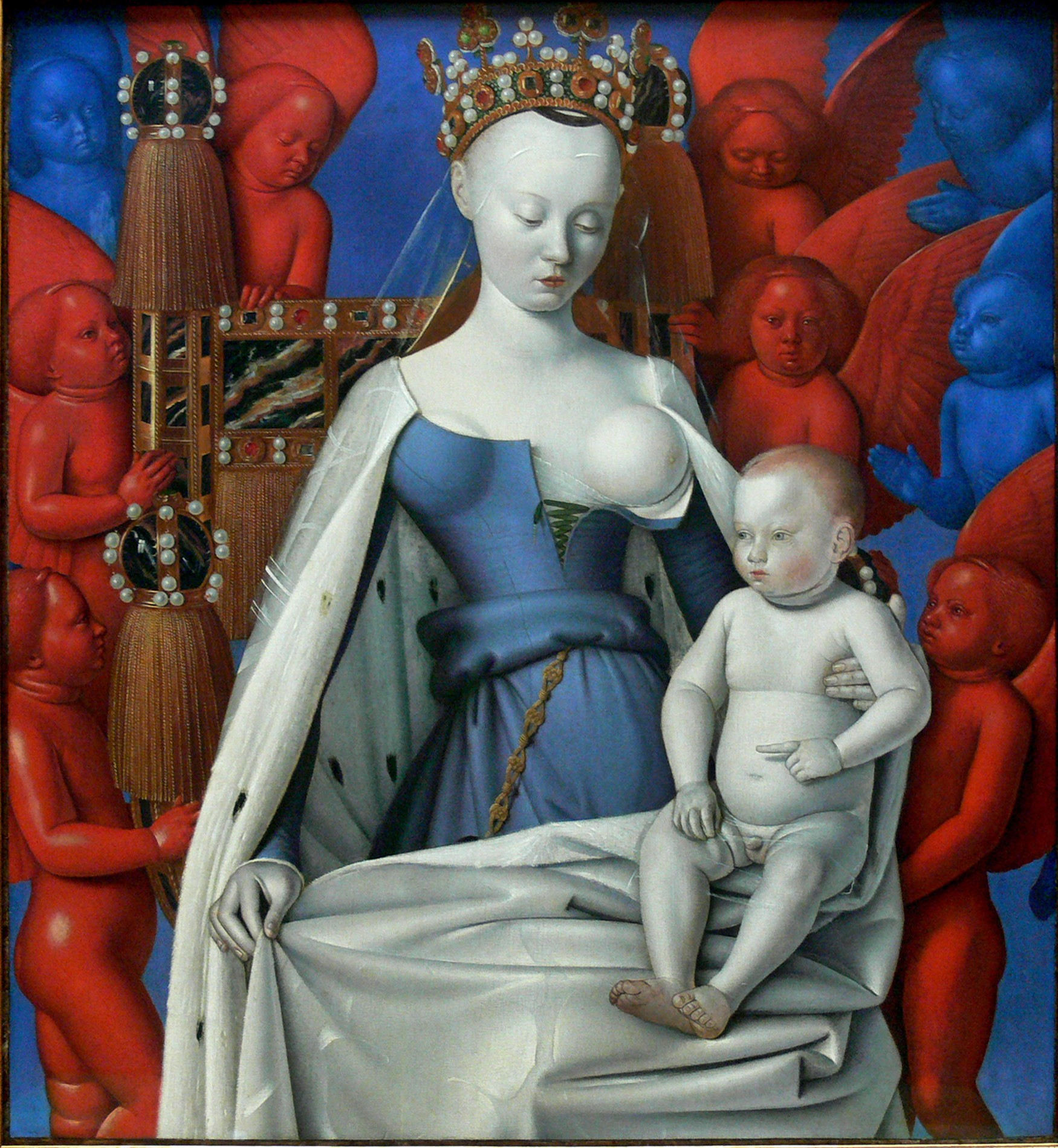
Right wing of the Melun Diptych, Jean Fouquet, 1452. Royal Museum of Fine Arts, Antwerp. This earlier portrait reflects the Gothic ideal found in the Christus portrait.

Christus frames his sitter in a rigid and balanced architectural setting. She is positioned within a narrow rectangular space, before a wainscotted wall. The image is divided by the horizontal parallel lines of her wainscot and blouse, which join at the inverted triangle formed by the neckline of her dress. The rendering of the background departs somewhat from contemporary conventions in portraiture: Christus sets the girl against a dark brown wall with little detail, in contrast to the elaborate interiors of Jan van Eyck, who is often regarded as Christus' master. It is defined entirely by its material, a wooden dado rail along the top and the wainscot that forms the lower portion. The wall sets her in a realistic interior, perhaps intended to represent a space within her home.

Light falls on the pictorial space from the left, creating shadows against the back wall, the strongest cast by the girl's hennin. The depth of space provided by the back wall gives room for this detailing, which Charles Sterling believes is indebted to van Eyck. The light throws a murky but curved shadow on the wall behind the girl and acts as a counterpoint to the contour of her cheek and hairline.

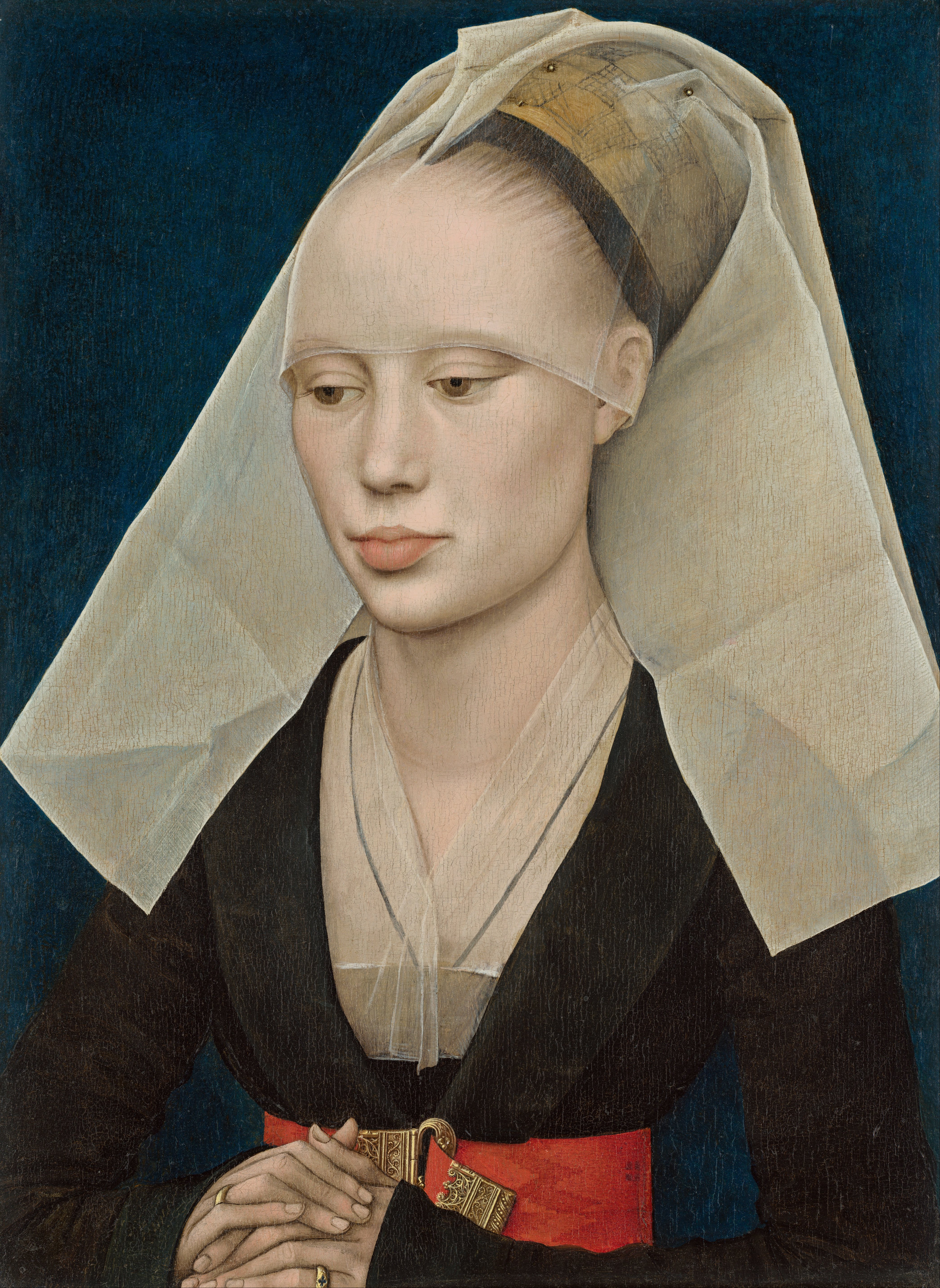
Portrait of a Woman, Rogier van der Weyden, c. 1460. National Gallery of Art, Washington, D.C. Similarities can be seen in the sculpted features and expression of the model.

The girl has pale skin, almond and slightly oriental eyes and a petulant mouth. She reflects the Gothic ideal of elongated facial features, narrow shoulders, tightly pinned hair and an almost unnaturally long forehead, achieved through tightly pulled-back hair which has been plucked at the top. She is dressed in expensive clothing and jewellery and seems to be uncommonly elegant. She looks out of the canvas in an oblique but self-aware and penetrating manner that some art historians have described as unnerving. Joanna Woods-Marsden remarks that a sitter acknowledging her audience in this way was virtually unprecedented even in Italian portrait painting. Her acknowledgment is accentuated by the painting's crop, which focuses the viewer's gaze in a near-invasive manner that seems to question the relationship between artist, model, patron and viewer.

The headdress is a variant of the truncated or bee-hive hennin, then fashionable at the Burgundian court. A very similar style, with no tail, is seen on the older of two girls in the donor panels of Presentation of Christ by the Master of the Prado Adoration of the Magi, a pupil of Rogier van der Weyden. The black band under the chin is rarely found in other images from the period, and has been interpreted as a style borrowed from the male chaperon hat, which always has a long tailing tail or cornette, sometimes worn wrapped under the chin in this way.

The influence of van Eyck can be seen in the delicate rendering of the textures and details of the dress, trimmings and adornments. Her pale skin and strong bone structure is strongly van Eyckian, and recalls the male sitter in his Arnolfini Portrait. But in other ways Christus abandons the developments made by van Eyck and Robert Campin. He reduces the emphasis on volume of those artists, in favour of an elongation of form; the narrow, slight upper body and head are, according to the German art historian Robert Suckale, "heightened by the V-shaped neckline of the ermine and the cylindrical hat." Further, while the first generation of Early Netherlandish painters benefited from the patronage of the newly emerging middle class, secularising portraiture, and removing it from the preserve of royalty, Christus renders the girl as aristocratic, haughty, sophisticated, and exquisitely dressed.

== Identity of the sitter ==
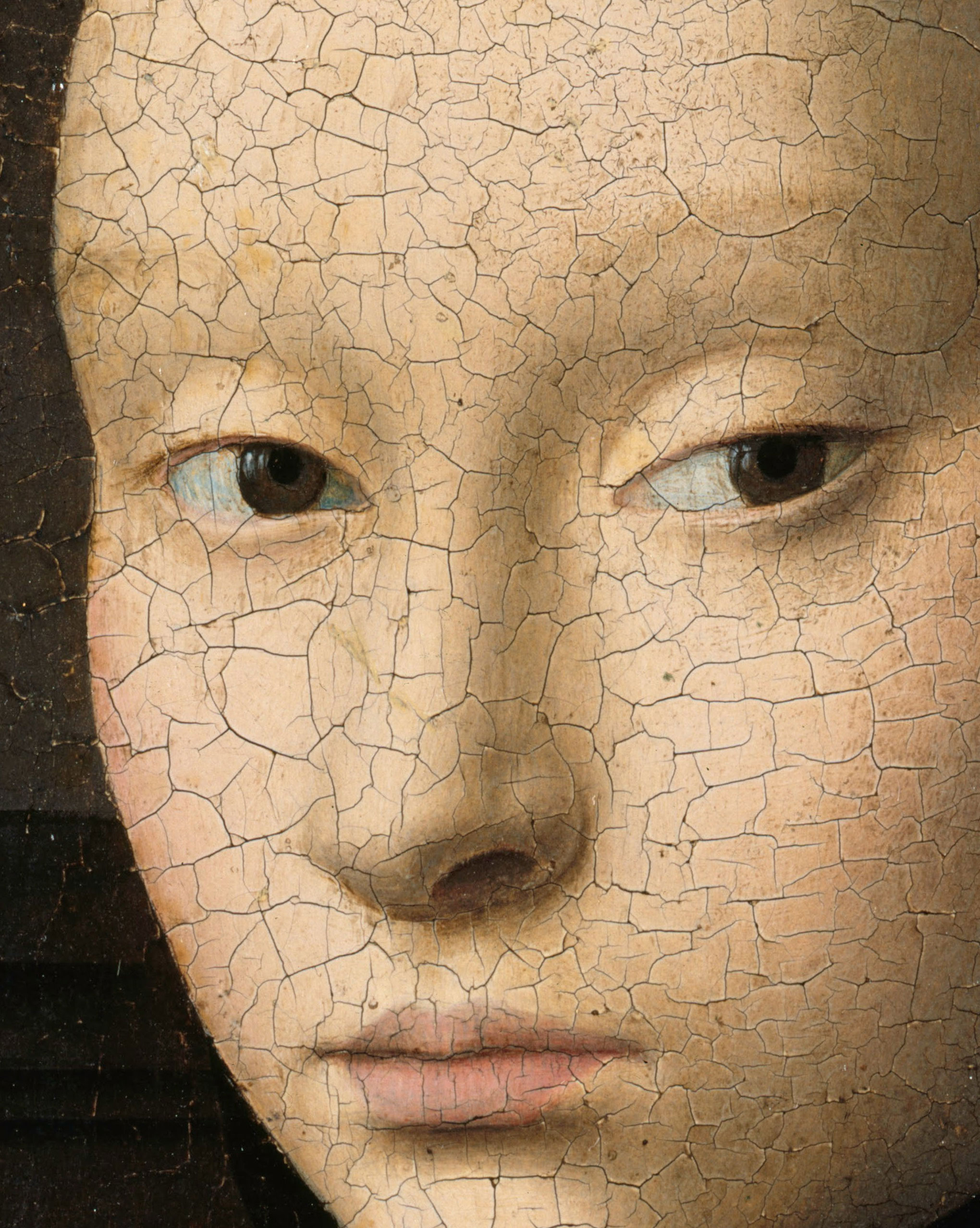
Detail showing extensive craquelure

In a letter dated 1824 or 1825 Gustav Waagen, later Director of the Berlin Museums, gave his interpretation of Latin inscriptions he had seen on the original frame of the portrait, which was subsequently lost. As well as a Christus signature, he found an identification of the sitter as "a niece of the famous Talbot" (eine Nichte des berühmten Talbots). His research led to a consensus that the sitter was a member of the leading English family, the Talbots, then headed by the Earl of Shrewsbury. In 1863 George Scharf suggested the panel was intended as the right-hand wing to a diptych with the 1446 Portrait of Edward Grimston (or "Grymston") in the National Gallery, London, leading to speculation that the girl might be Grimston's first wife, Alice. This was rejected by Grete Ring in 1913, on the basis that neither the dimensions nor background of the panels match, and that the Berlin panel was most probably completed some 20–30 years after the Grimston portrait.

Joel Upton, supporting Waagen's analysis, investigated whether the "famous Talbot" was John Talbot, 1st Earl of Shrewsbury, killed at the Battle of Castillon in 1453. However, John Talbot had only one niece, Ankaret, who died in infancy in 1421. Lorne Campbell suggests that given the Latin signature, Waagen might have misinterpreted the word "nepos", which can also mean "grandchild". Upton concludes that she was more likely a daughter of John Talbot, 2nd Earl of Shrewsbury, either Anne or Margaret. Their parents married between 1444 and 1445, suggesting that the sitter was under 20 at the time of the portrait. She may have travelled to Bruges to attend the famously lavish wedding in 1468 of Margaret of York, sister of Edward IV of England, to Charles the Bold, Duke of Burgundy.

== Provenance ==
The earliest extant record of the painting is in a 1492 inventory of the Medici family, where it is described as a small panel bust of a French lady, coloured in oil, the work of Pietro Cresci of Bruges. However, it seems from other works in the collection that the scribe was uninformed and noted any piece of northern art in the collection as "French". It was highly valued, with an unusually high price of 40 florins, and prominently displayed. The record does not address the matter of the girl's identity beyond her nationality, indicating that the painting was regarded as of aesthetic rather than historical interest.

Master of the Prado Adoration of the Magi, Presentation, c. 1470. National Gallery of Art, Washington

The 20th-century art historian Erwin Panofsky was instrumental in furthering Christus' reputation as a major 15th-century northern painter, and described the work as an "enchanting, almost French-looking portrait", noting its resemblance to the Virgin in Jean Fouquet's Melun Diptych. Sterling picks up on this, noting the many similarities between the two women, including their tightly pulled-back hair, high cheekbones, slanted eyes and sulky expressions.

The portrait entered the Prussian royal collection with the purchase in 1821 of the Edward Solly collection, from which the then-recently formed Gemäldegalerie, Berlin, was allowed to take its pick. It was positively identified in 1825 as an original by Christus when Waagen identified the lettering on the (now lost) frame "PETR XPI" as shorthand for "Petrus Christophori", which he associated with the "Pietro Christa" mentioned by Giorgio Vasari in the 1568 edition of his "Lives of the Most Excellent Painters, Sculptors, and Architects". In this way, Waagen also identified Christus' so-called Saint Eligius panel, now in the Metropolitan Museum of Art, New York (and seen as just a portrait of a goldsmith), marking the painter's rediscovery after centuries of obscurity.

Before this identification, a number of his paintings had been attributed to van Eyck, but became associated with Christus after Waagen established him as a distinct and separate master. Christus is known to have signed six extant works, sometimes with the text "PETR XPI ME FECIT" (Petr Xpi made me). Over the next century sketches of Christus' biography were constructed, as art historians – notably Panofsky – slowly disentangled his works from those of van Eyck.

== Dating ==
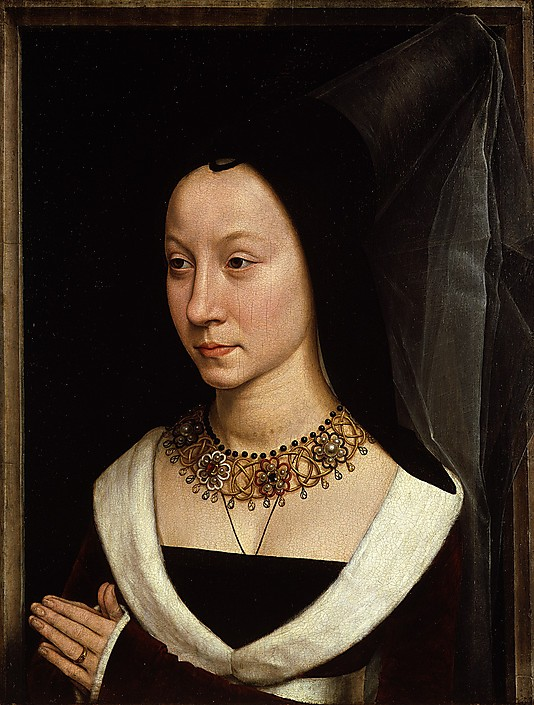
Portrait of Maria Portinari, Hans Memling, c. 1470. Metropolitan Museum of Art, New York

The painting was dated c. 1446 by Wolfgang Schöne in the 1930s, mainly by matching the style and fashion of her clothing to contemporary trends. In the early 20th century the dating and authorship of works then attributed to Christus were challenged. Max Friedländer proposed a number of dates and an ordering of works in the 1957 volume of his Early Netherlandish painting, but many of his assumptions were discounted by Otto Pächt just a few years later.

In 1953, Erwin Panofsky established that Schöne's dating was at least twenty years too early. In his view, the girl's dress resembles Burgundian high fashion of the late 1460s to mid-1470s. He compared the hennin worn by Maria Portinari in a c. 1470 portrait by Hans Memling, and her gown to that worn by a lady in an illumination from around the 1470s Froissart of Louis of Gruuthuse of Bruges. Sterling, placing the work as c. 1465, remarks that the hennin in the Berlin panel is of a different type to that of the New York painting. The New York headdress is far more extended, seems to be of a style prevalent a few years after, and lacks the draped and hanging veil. Sterling further notes that the panel has increased depth of field and more intricate detailing of light than Christus' earlier works. On this basis he believes the work was executed late in the artist's career.

== Sources ==
- Ainsworth, Maryan. Petrus Christus: Renaissance Master of Bruges. New York: Metropolitan Museum of Art, 1994. ISBN 0-8109-6482-1
- Brown, David Alan. Virtue and Beauty: Leonardo's Ginevra de' Benci and Renaissance Portraits of Women. Princeton, NJ: Princeton University Press, 2003. ISBN 978-0-691-11456-9
- Campbell, Lorne, review of Petrus Christus by Peter H. Schabacker, 1975, The Burlington Magazine, Vol. 117, No. 871 (Oct., 1975), pp. 676–677, JSTOR
- Gemäldegalerie, Berlin. Prestel Museum Guide, 1998, Prestel Verlag. ISBN 3-7913-1912-4
- Hand, John Oliver; Metzger, Catherine; Spron, Ron. Prayers and Portraits: Unfolding the Netherlandish Diptych. New Haven, CT: Yale University Press, 2006. ISBN 0-300-12155-5
- Harbison, Craig. The Art of the Northern Renaissance. London: Laurence King Publishing, 1995. ISBN 1-78067-027-3
- Kemperdick, Stephan. The Early Portrait, from the Collection of the Prince of Liechtenstein and the Kunstmuseum Basel. Munich: Prestel, 2006. ISBN 3-7913-3598-7
- Nash, Susie. Northern Renaissance art. Oxford: Oxford History of Art, 2008. ISBN 0-19-284269-2
- Panofsky, Erwin. Early Netherlandish Painting. London: Harper Collins, 1953. ISBN 0-06-430002-1
- Ridderbos, Bernhard; Van Buren, Anne; Van Veen, Henk. Early Netherlandish Paintings: Rediscovery, Reception and Research. Amsterdam: Amsterdam University Press, 2005. ISBN 0-89236-816-0
- Russell, Archibald. (mis-catalogued as "Archibald G. B. Russell and Rouge Croix" by JSTOR!) "Van Eyck and His Followers", letter in The Burlington Magazine for Connoisseurs, 1922, Vol. 40, No. 227 (Feb., 1922), p. 102, Van Eyck and His Followers, JSTOR
- Stapleford, Richard. Lorenzo De' Medici at Home: The Inventory of the Palazzo Medici in 1492. Manchester: Manchester University Press, 2013. ISBN 0-271-05641-X
- Sterling, Charles. "Observations on Petrus Christus". The Art Bulletin, Vol. 53, No. 1, March 1971
- Suckale, Robert. Gothic. Cologne: Taschen. ISBN 3-8228-5292-9
- Upton, Joel Morgan. Petrus Christus: His Place in Fifteenth-Century Flemish painting. University Park, PA: Pennsylvania State University Press, 1989 ISBN 0-271-00672-2
- Van der Elst, Baron Joseph. The Last Flowering of the Middle Ages. Whitefish MA: Kessinger Publishing, 2005. ISBN 1-4191-3806-5
