= Portrait of Edward Grimston =

Painting by Petrus Christus

- Artist: Petrus Christus
- Year: 1446
- Type: Oil on oak
- Dimensions: 32 cm × 24 cm (13 in × 9.4 in)
- Location: National Gallery, London

Portrait of Edward Grimston is a 1446 oil-on-panel painting by the Early Netherlandish artist Petrus Christus. It shows the English diplomat Edward Grimston (died 1478) who was then Henry VI of England's ambassador to the court of Philip the Good, Duke of Burgundy.

The panel is owned by Edward Grimston's descendant John Grimston, 7th Earl of Verulam (b. 1951), and has been on permanent loan to the National Gallery in London since 1927.

== Commission ==
The painting was executed on the same panel as Christus' Portrait of a Carthusian of the same year, leading to speculation that they depict the same man. The two works are amongst the earliest and finest of Christus's portrait paintings. Although heavily influenced by Christus' predecessors Jan van Eyck and Rogier van der Weyden, both paintings are noteworthy for their fully realised backgrounds, which break from the earlier artists' tendency to place their sitters in flat and barely described dark spaces.

== Description ==
Edward Grimston of Sussex (died 1478) was an English diplomat in the service of Henry VI of England, and is identifiable from the coat of arms on the wall behind him. Grimston conducted negotiations between Henry VI and the court of Philip the Good, Duke of Burgundy during the 1440s. Art historians assume that Grimston commissioned the painting to enhance his reputation during a period when Early Netherlandish painting was at the peak of its reputation. He would have sat for the portrait during a visit to Bruges while acting as a diplomat.

Grimston is presented, like the better-known Portrait of a Carthusian which was painted on the same panel, in the corner of a room bounded by a ceiling with exposed wooden beams and a side wall illuminated by a tall round window. The red and dark blue garments have embroidered motifs. He wears a black hat and a gold chain around his neck, which denotes his wealth and social status.

The painter's signature on ornamental capitals, is composed of a heart-shaped mark followed by "PETRVS· XPI " and below this the date "ME· FECIT· A° 1446" on a green marbled background. The two lines of the inscription are painted differently, with the first in red with black outlines and the second in two shades of red with black outlines. Given that the flourishes are clumsy, the inscription was probably not painted by Petrus Christus himself, although the date is likely correct.

== Sources ==
- Ainsworth, Maryan. Petrus Christus: Renaissance Master of Bruges. New York: Metropolitan Museum of Art, 1994. ISBN 0-8109-6482-1
- Campbell, Lorne. The Fifteenth Century Netherlandish Paintings. London: National Gallery, 1998. ISBN 1-857-09171-X
- Franks, A. W. Instructions Given to Edward Grimston and Others, by King Henry the Sixth and Notice of a Portrait of Edward Grimston, painted by Peter Christus in 1446. The Royal Library of Belgium, via J. B. Nichols and Sons, 1870
- Richmond, Colin. The Paston Family in the Fifteenth Century. Manchester: Manchester University Press, 2001. ISBN 0-7190-5990-9
- Upton, Joel Morgan. Petrus Christus: His Place in Fifteenth-Century Flemish painting. University Park, PA: Pennsylvania State University Press, 1989. ISBN 0-2710-0672-2
