= Portrait of an Elderly Woman =

Painting by Hans Memling

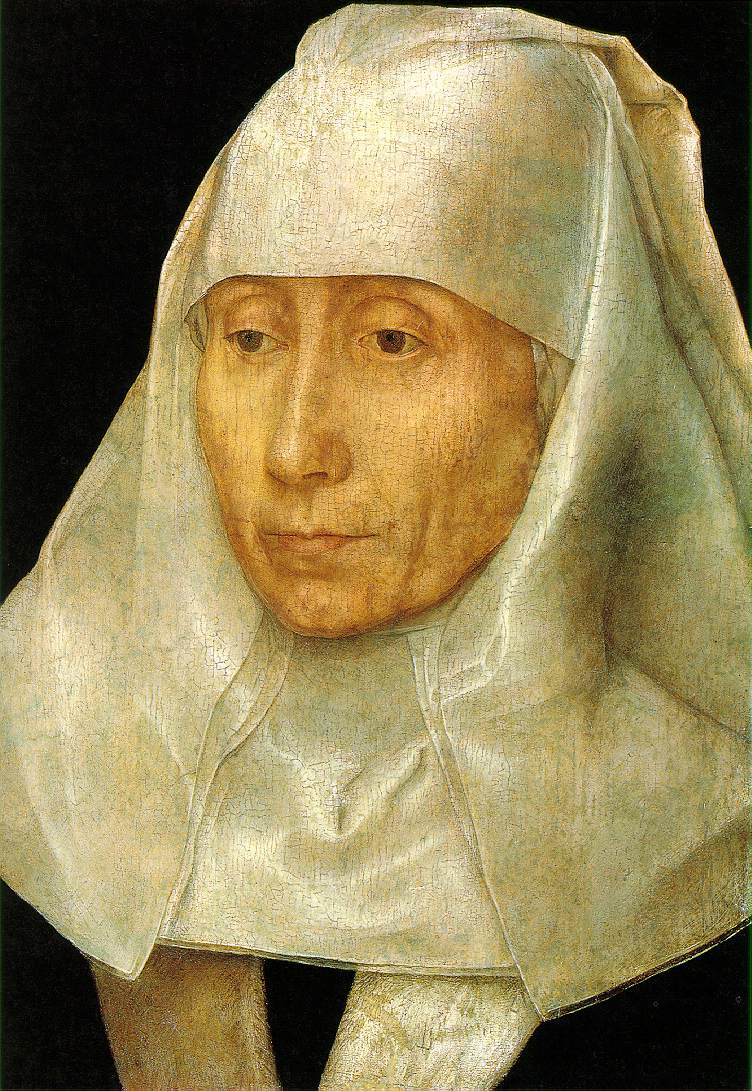
Portrait of an Old Woman, c 1480, 26.5 x 17.8cm (14.6 × 10.6in). Museum of Fine Arts, Houston

Portrait of an Old Woman is a small oil on wood panel painting by the Early Netherlandish painter Hans Memling, completed c 1475–80, and in the collection of the Museum of Fine Arts, Houston, Texas, since 1944. The panel has obviously been cut down, given its tight framing. The woman's face and headdress dominate the remaining pictorial space; they create a strong contrast between her cream headgear and the black background and the lower portion of the painting, which was originally bluish-green, but has darkened with age and accumulated dirt. Yet the panel is in good condition following a restoration that replaced lost paint in several areas.

The panel is noted for its dramatic contrasts in light and colour, and its subtle treatment of skin tones, which are comparable to Memling's c. 1472 Portrait of Maria Portinari in New York.

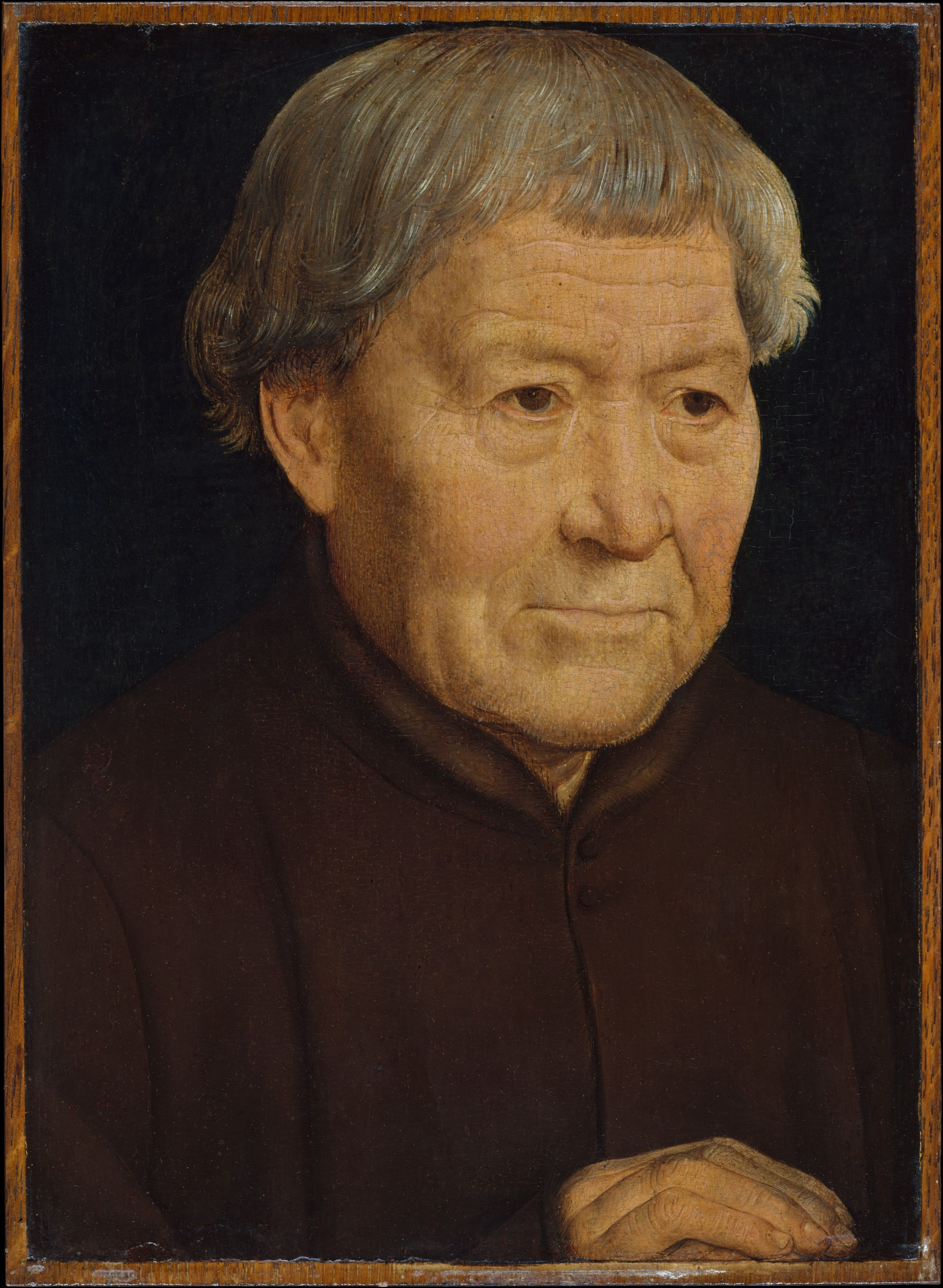
Portrait of an Elderly Man, Hans Memling, 1475 or thereabouts

The painting was obviously at one time a donor wing, either for a diptych or triptych, which was broken apart at some stage. It is probably thus related to the Portrait of an Elderly Man now in the Metropolitan Museum of Art, New York. That reasoning for the two paintings commission is unknown, but it is likely they were intended as donor portraits for a larger work.

The painting was in Paris in 1910, when it was sold to C. von Hollitscher of Berlin. From there, it passed into the von Auspitz collection in Vienna until 1931. The art dealer Bachstitz acquired it, who sold it to Percy S. Straus in 1934. The painting was bequeathed to the Museum of Fine Arts in 1944.

== Sources ==
- Panofsky, Erwin. Early Netherlandish Painting. London: Harper Collins, 1953. ISBN 978-0-06-430002-5
- De Vos, Dirk. Hans Memling: The Complete Works. Ghent: Harry N Abrams, 1994. ISBN 978-0-8109-3649-2
