= Petrus Christus =

Flemish painter (c.1410–1475)

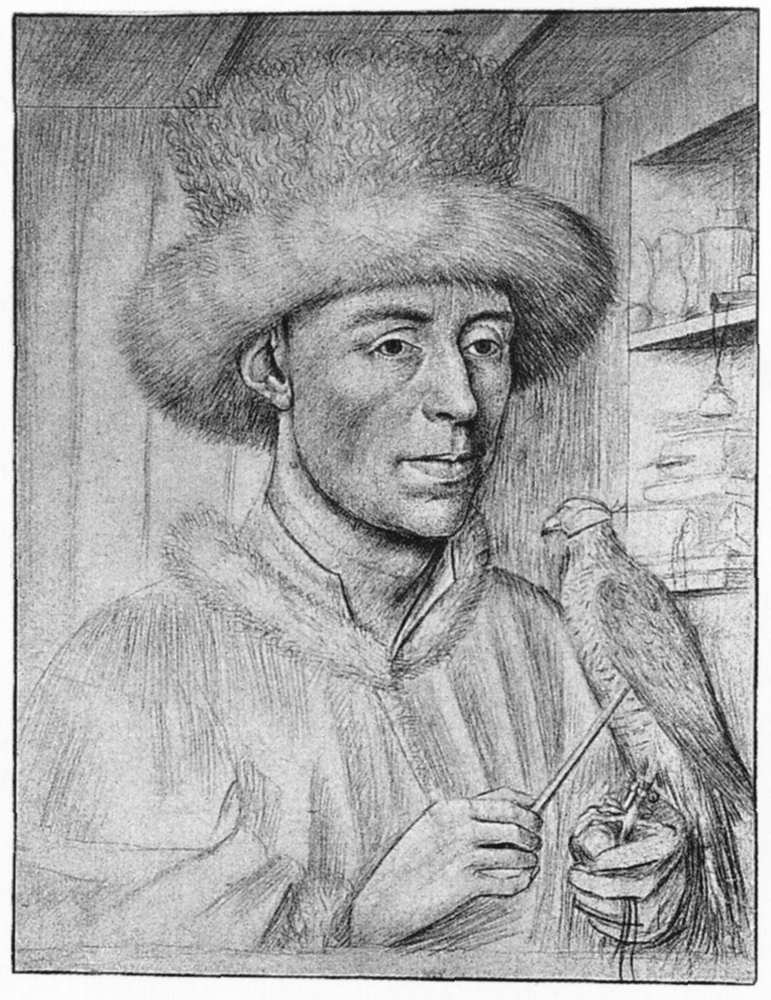
Possible self-portrait

Petrus Christus (Dutch: [ˈpeːtrʏs ˈkrɪstʏs, ˈxrɪs-]; c. 1410/1420 – c. 1475/1476) was an Early Netherlandish painter active in Bruges from 1444, where, along with Hans Memling, he became the leading painter after the death of Jan van Eyck. He was influenced by van Eyck and Rogier van der Weyden and is noted for his innovations with linear perspective and a meticulous technique which seems derived from miniatures and manuscript illumination. Today, some 30 works are confidently attributed to him. The best known include the Portrait of a Carthusian (1446) and Portrait of a Young Girl (c. 1470); both are highly innovative in the presentation of the figure against detailed, rather than flat, backgrounds.

For the period between the death of Jan van Eyck in 1441 and Hans Memling's establishment in the city in the mid-1460s, Christus was the leading painter in Bruges, which was then the leading Netherlandish centre of painting.

Christus was an anonymous figure for centuries, his importance not established until the work of modern art historians. Giorgio Vasari barely mentions him in his biographies of painters, written in the Renaissance, and near-contemporary records merely list him amongst many others. In the early to mid-nineteenth century, Gustav Waagen (who identified him French-style as "Pierre Christophsen") and Johann David Passavant were important in establishing Christus's biographical details and in attributing works to him.

== Life ==
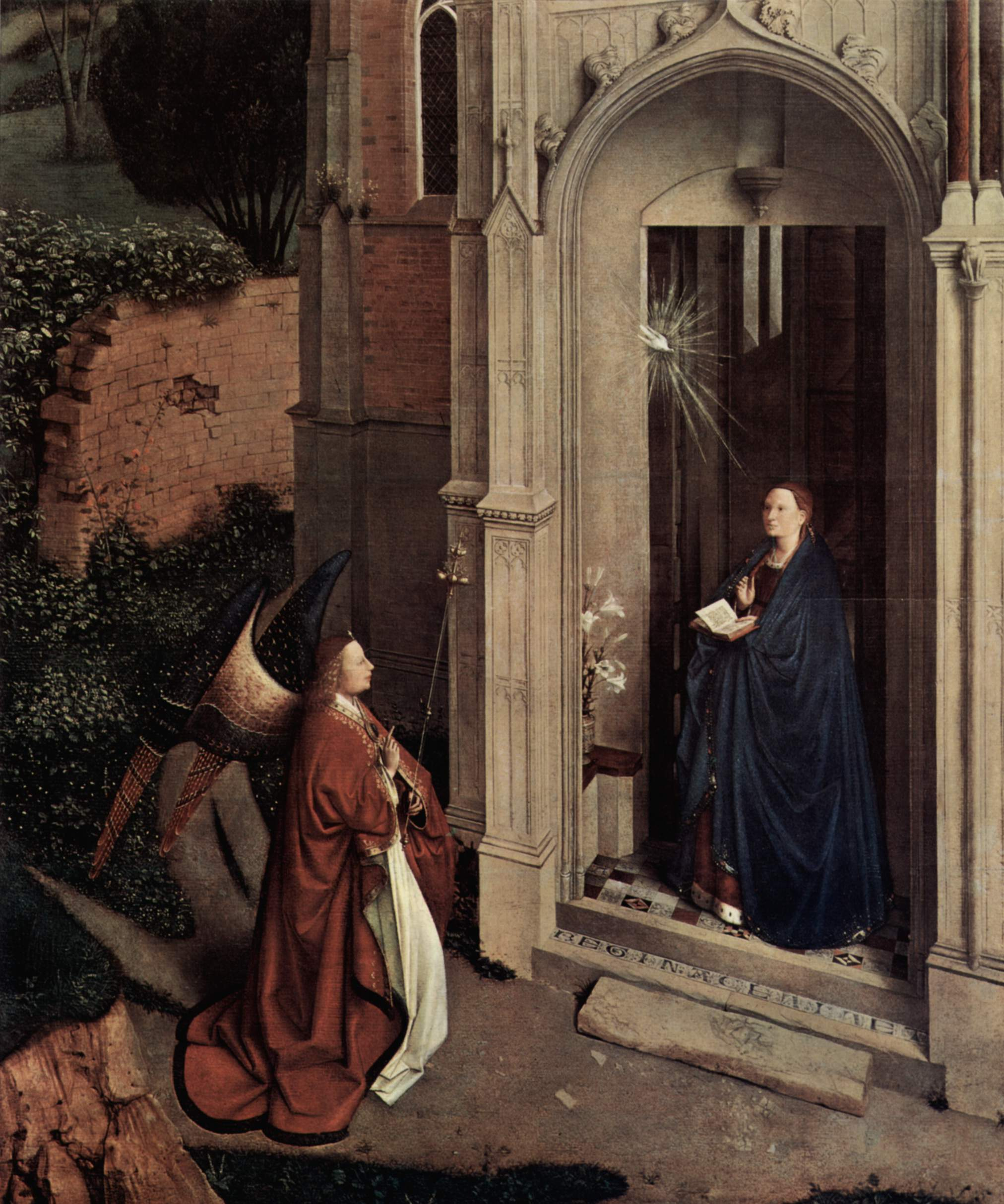
Annunciation, c. 1445, Metropolitan

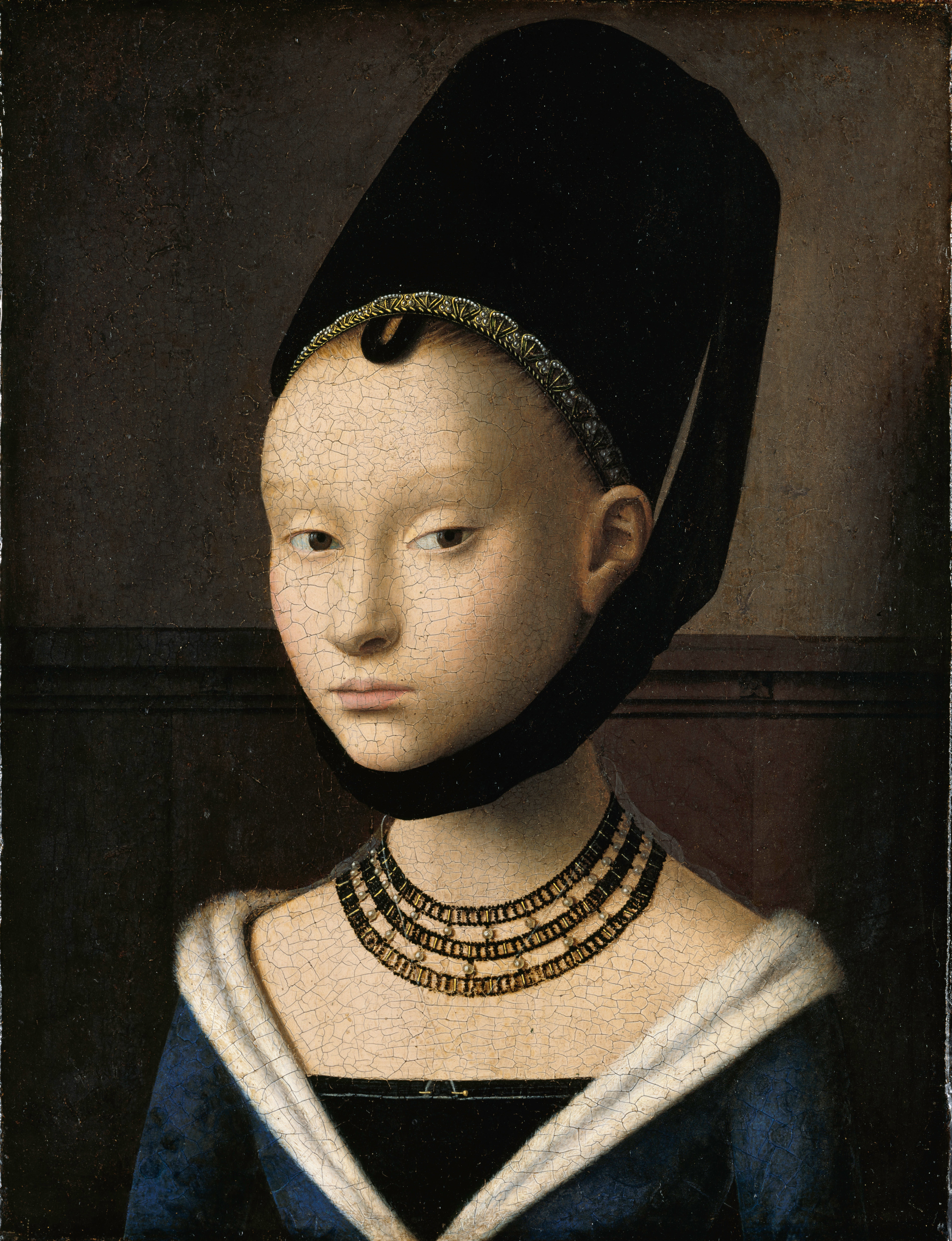
Portrait of a Young Girl, c. 1470. Gemäldegalerie, Berlin

Christus was born in Baarle, near Antwerp and Breda. Long considered a student of and successor to Jan van Eyck, he has sometimes been confused with van Eyck. At the death of van Eyck in 1441, it is thought that Christus took over his master's workshop. Christus purchased his Bruges citizenship in 1444, exactly three years after van Eyck's death, taking advantage of a decree set down by Philip the Good allowing in men indebted to him after the Bruges Revolt of 1436–1438. Had he been an active pupil in van Eyck's Bruges workshop in 1441, he would have received his citizenship automatically after the customary period of one year and one day. Christus may have been van Eyck's successor in the Bruges school, but perhaps not his pupil. Recent research shows that Christus, long seen only in his predecessor's light, was an independent painter whose work shows just as much influence from, among others, Dirk Bouts, Robert Campin and Rogier van der Weyden. It is unknown whether Christus visited Italy and brought the style and technical accomplishments of the Northern European painters directly to Antonello da Messina and other Italian artists, but it is known that his paintings were purchased by Italians from the large community of foreign merchants in Bruges. Indeed, nearly half of his paintings were commissioned by Italians, or have a provenance from Italy or Spain, or were soon copied in those countries.

A document testifying to the presence of a "Piero da Bruggia" (Petrus from Bruges?) in Milan may suggest that he visited that city at the same time as Antonello, and the two artists may even have met. This might account for the remarkable similarities between the Portrait of a Man attributed to Christus in the Los Angeles County Museum of Art and many of Antonello's portraits, including the supposed self-portrait in the National Gallery in London. It would also explain how Italian painters learned about oil painting and how Northern painters learned about linear perspective. Antonello, along with Giovanni Bellini, was one of the first Italian painters to use oil paint like his Netherlandish contemporaries. Further, Christus' Virgin and Child Enthroned with Saints Francis and Jerome in Frankfurt, seemingly dated 1457 (the third digit is illegible), is the first known Northern picture to demonstrate accurate linear perspective.

In 1462, Christus and his wife, Gaudicine, enrolled at the Confraternity of the Dry Tree, from which his Madonna of the Dry Tree may derive its name. He was made a member of the Guild of Saint Luke and made dean of the guild in 1471. Bruges listed him dead in 1473, though the Metropolitan Museum of Art says he died in 1475 or 1476.

Hans Memling succeeded Christus as the next great painter in Bruges.

== Work ==
Christus produced at least six signed and dated works, which form the basis for any other attributions to him. These are: the Portrait of Edward Grymeston (on loan to the National Gallery, London, 1446), the Portrait of a Carthusian (Metropolitan Museum of Art, New York, 1446), the so-called St. Eligius in His Shop (Metropolitan Museum of Art Robert Lehman Collection, New York, 1449), the Virgin Nursing the Child (now in the Koninklijk Museum voor Schone Kunsten, Antwerp, 1449), the so-called "Berlin Altar Wings" with the Annunciation, Nativity, and Last Judgment (Gemäldegalerie, Staatliche Museen zu Berlin, 1452), and the Virgin and Child Enthroned with Saints Jerome and Francis (Städel, Frankfurt am Main, 1457?). In addition, a pair of panels in the Groeningemuseum in Bruges (showing the Annunciation and Nativity) bears a date of 1452, but its authenticity is suspect.

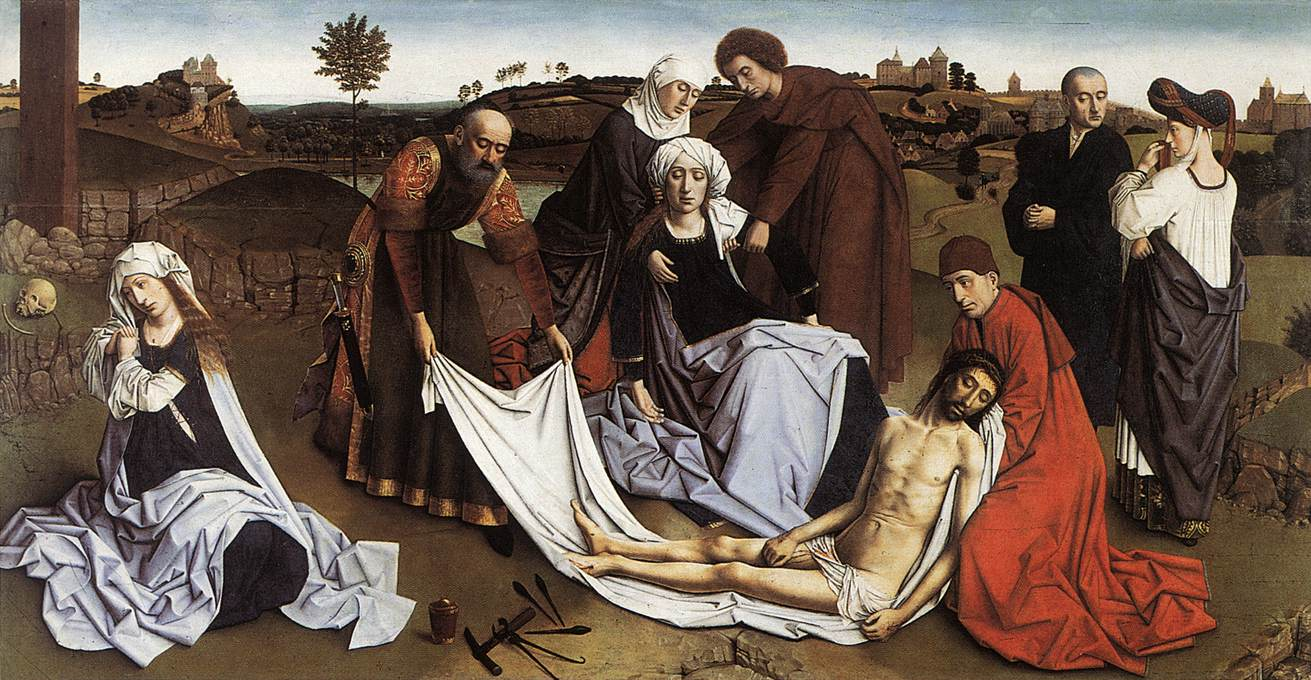
Lamentation, c. 1455–1460. Royal Museums of Fine Arts of Belgium, Brussels

The composition of his Lamentation, now at the Metropolitan Museum of Art, seems closely inspired by a marble relief by Antonello Gagini in the cathedral at Palermo that it has been suggested that the picture may have been painted for an Italian client. The Metropolitan Museum of Art has five of the thirty paintings usually attributed to him.

A late work, the reserved Portrait of a Young Girl (c. 1470, Berlin) belongs among the masterworks of Early Netherlandish painting, marking a new development in Netherlandish portraiture. It no longer shows the sitter in front of a neutral background, but in a concrete space defined by the background wall panels. Christus had already perfected this format in his two portraits of 1446. The unknown woman, whose exquisite clothing suggests that she might come from France, radiates an aura of discretion and of nobility, while appearing slightly unreal in the elegant stylization of her form.

== Gallery ==
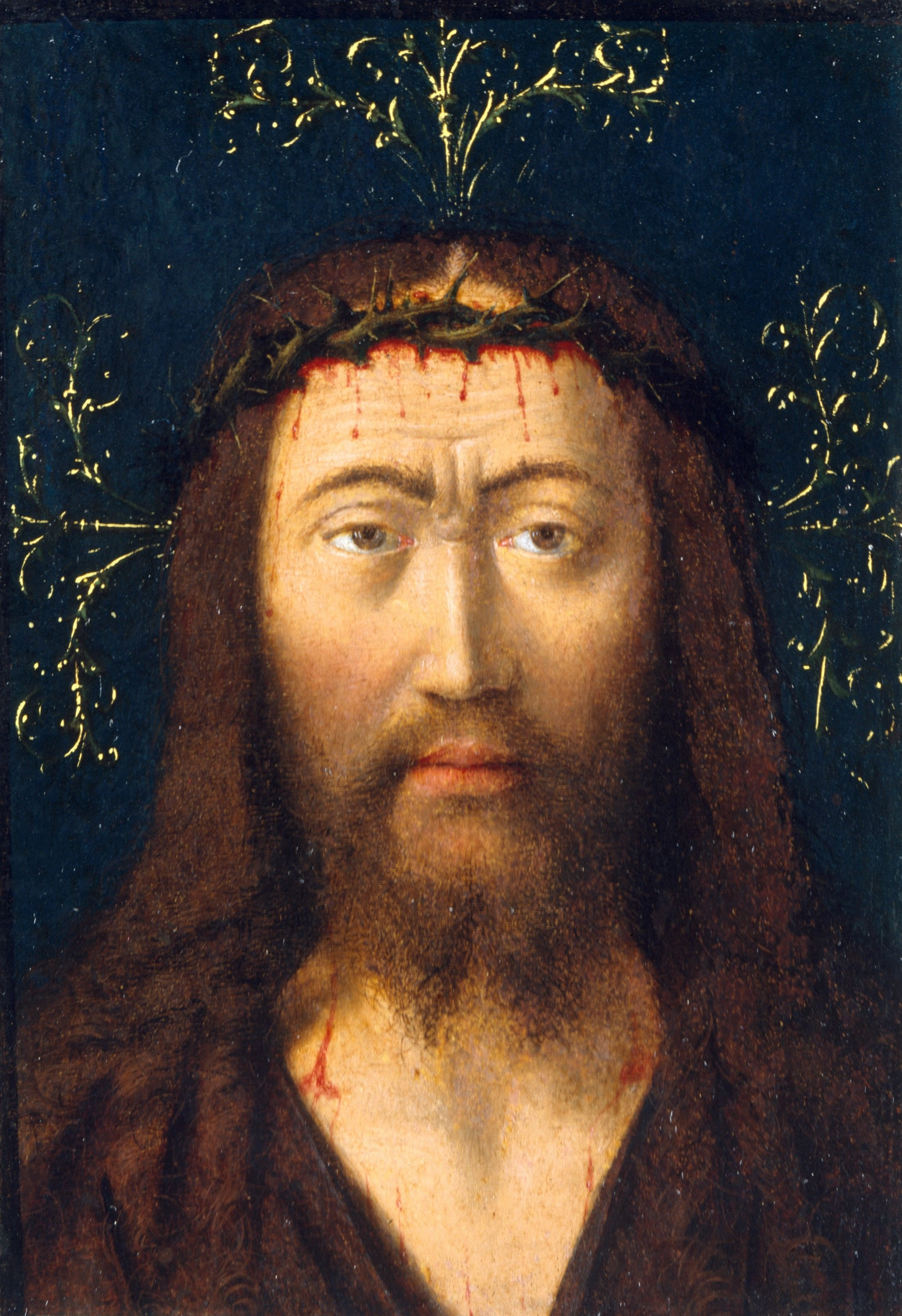
Ecce Homo, Christus, c. 1445, Metropolitan Museum of Art, New York

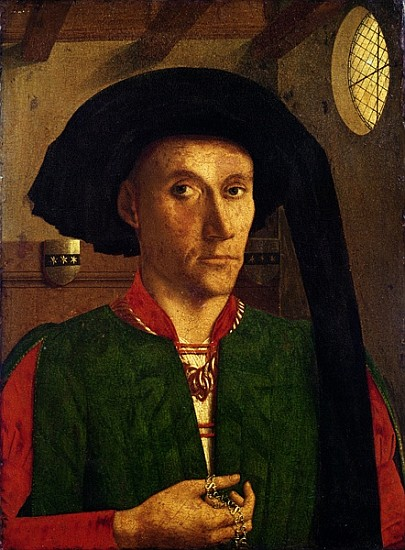
Portrait of Edward Grimston, 1446. National Gallery, London

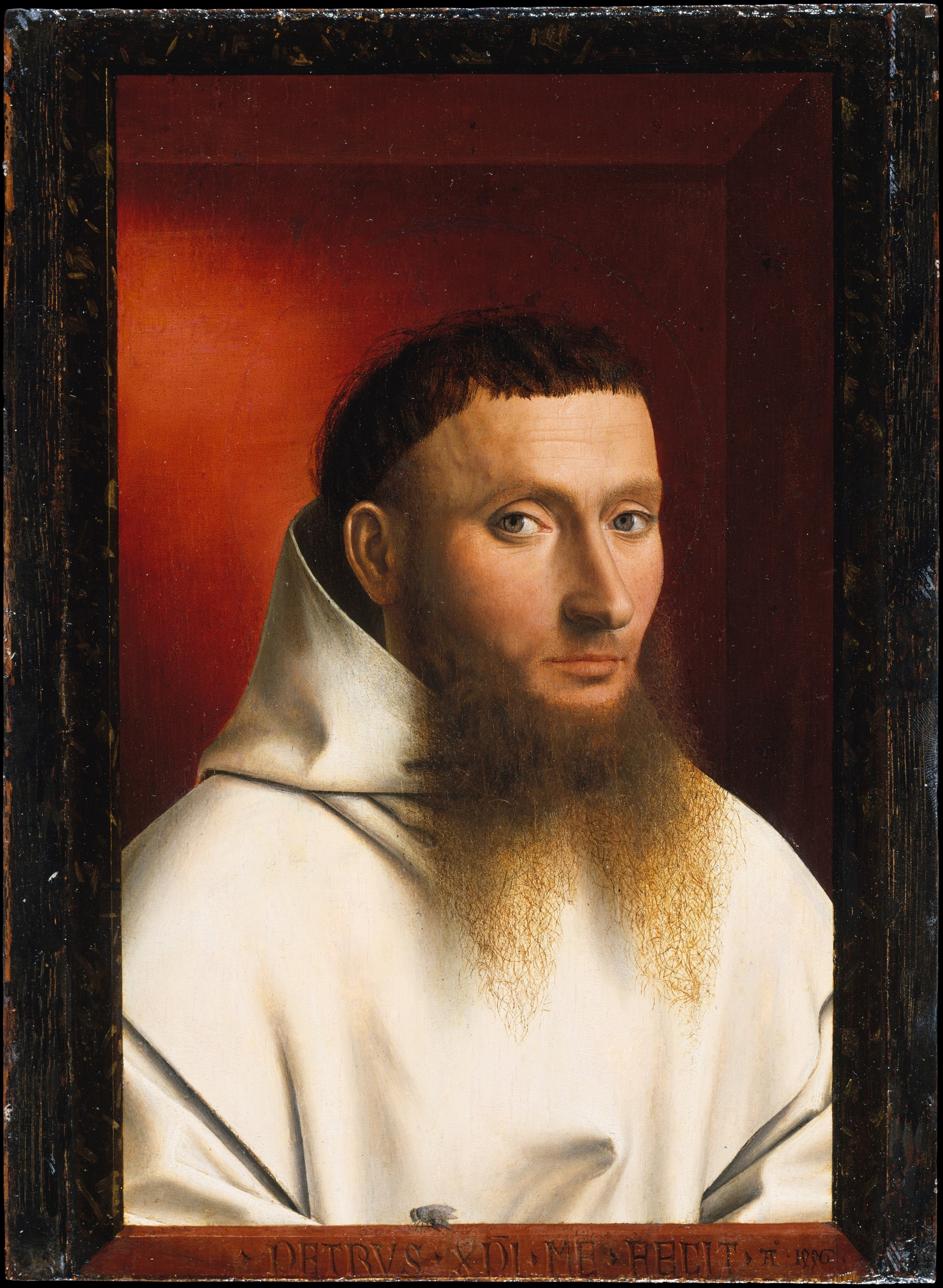
Portrait of a Carthusian, 1446, Metropolitan

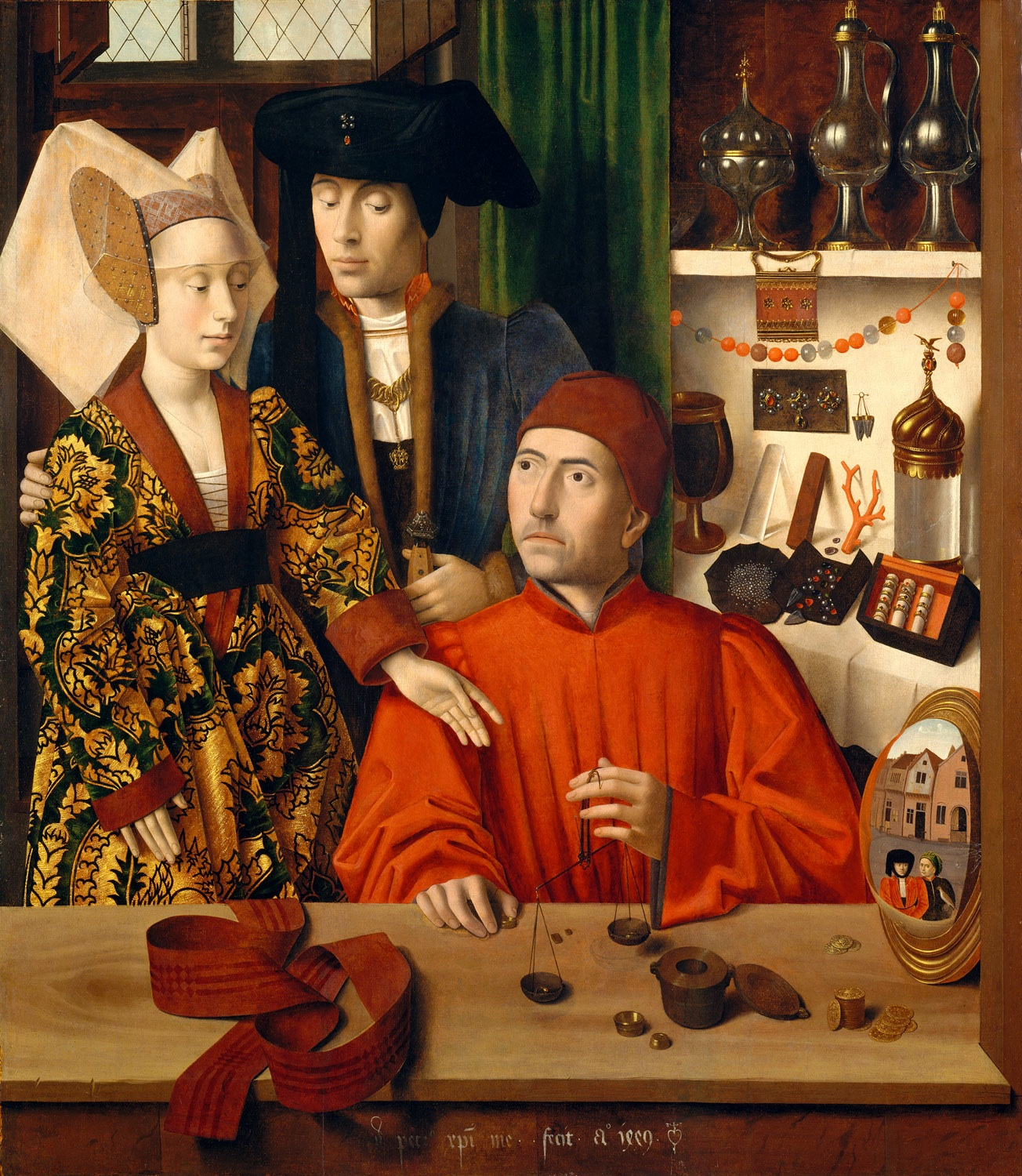
A Goldsmith in His Shop, 1449, Metropolitan

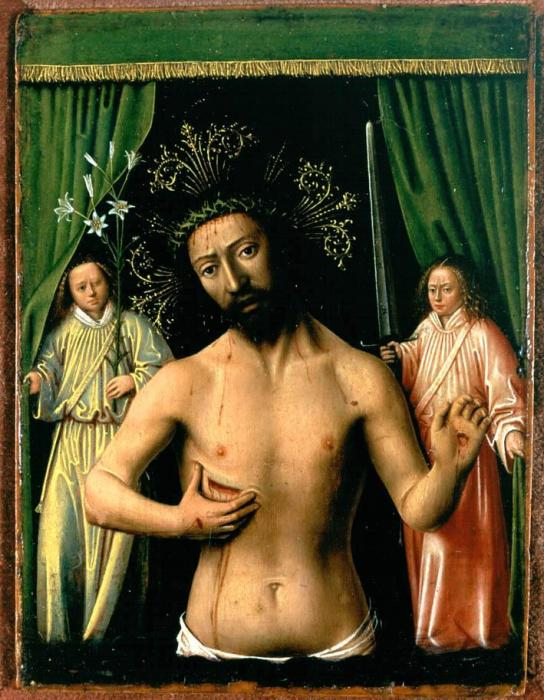
Man of Sorrows, c. 1450. Birmingham Museum and Art Gallery, England

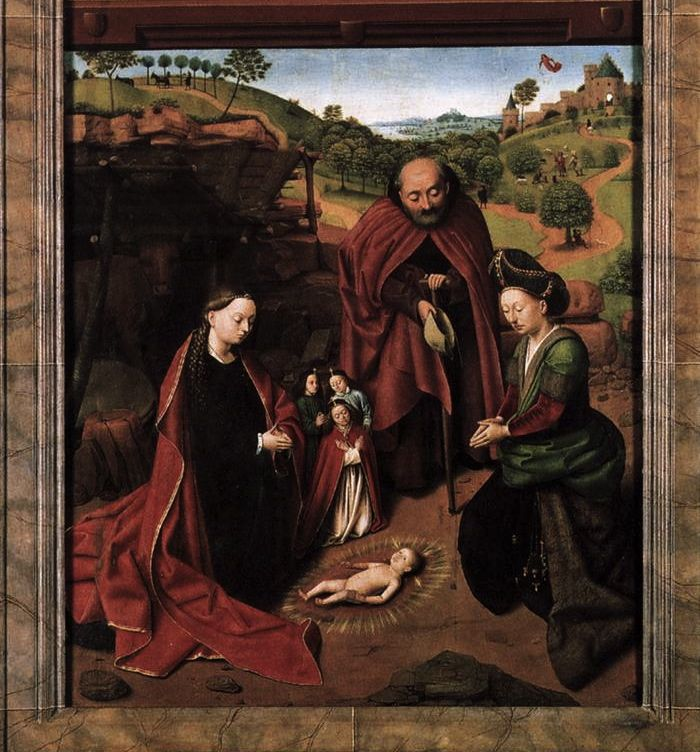
Nativity, 1452, Gemäldegalerie, Berlin

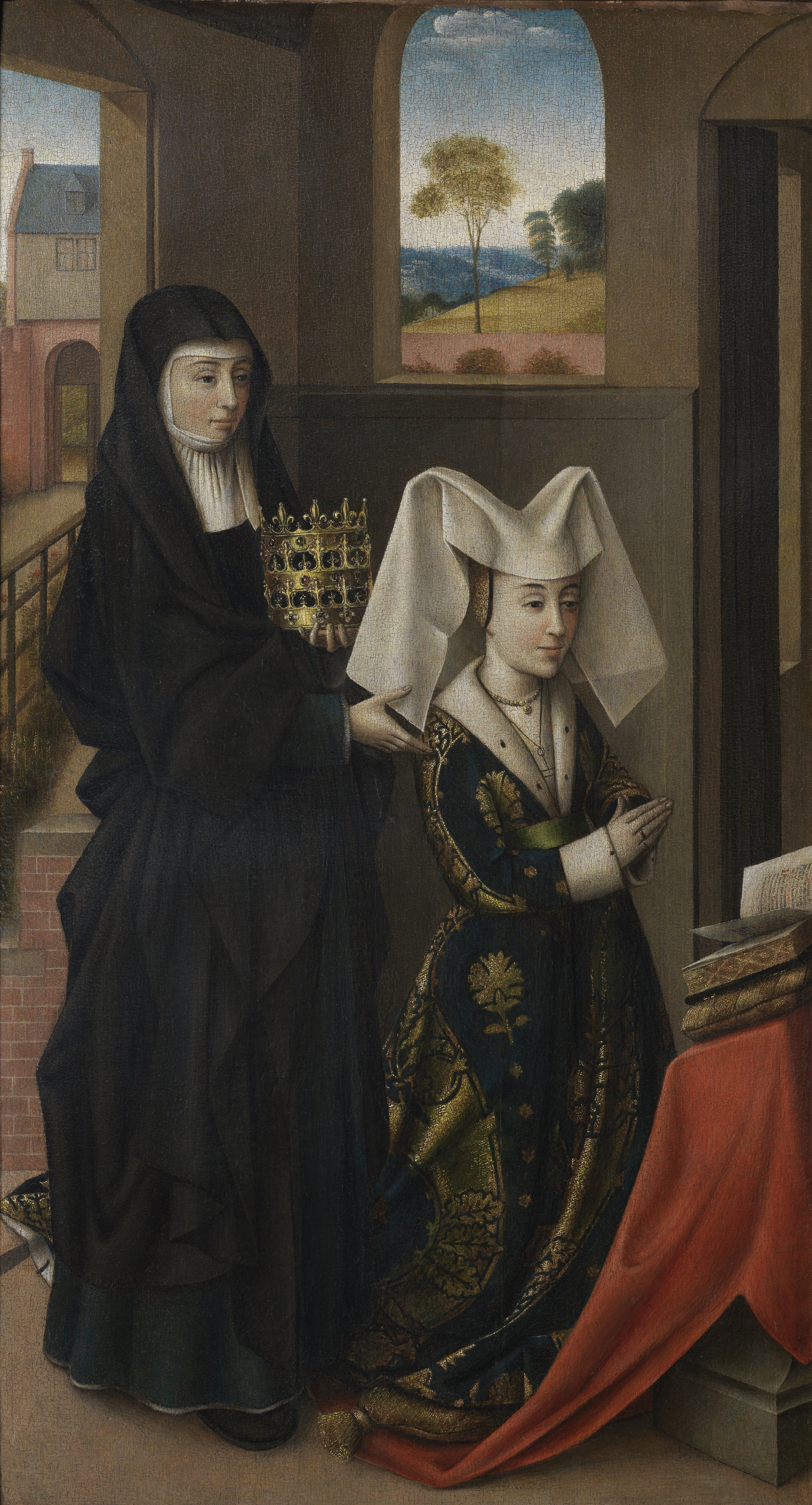
Isabella of Portugal with Saint Elizabeth, 1457–1460, Groeningemuseum, Bruges

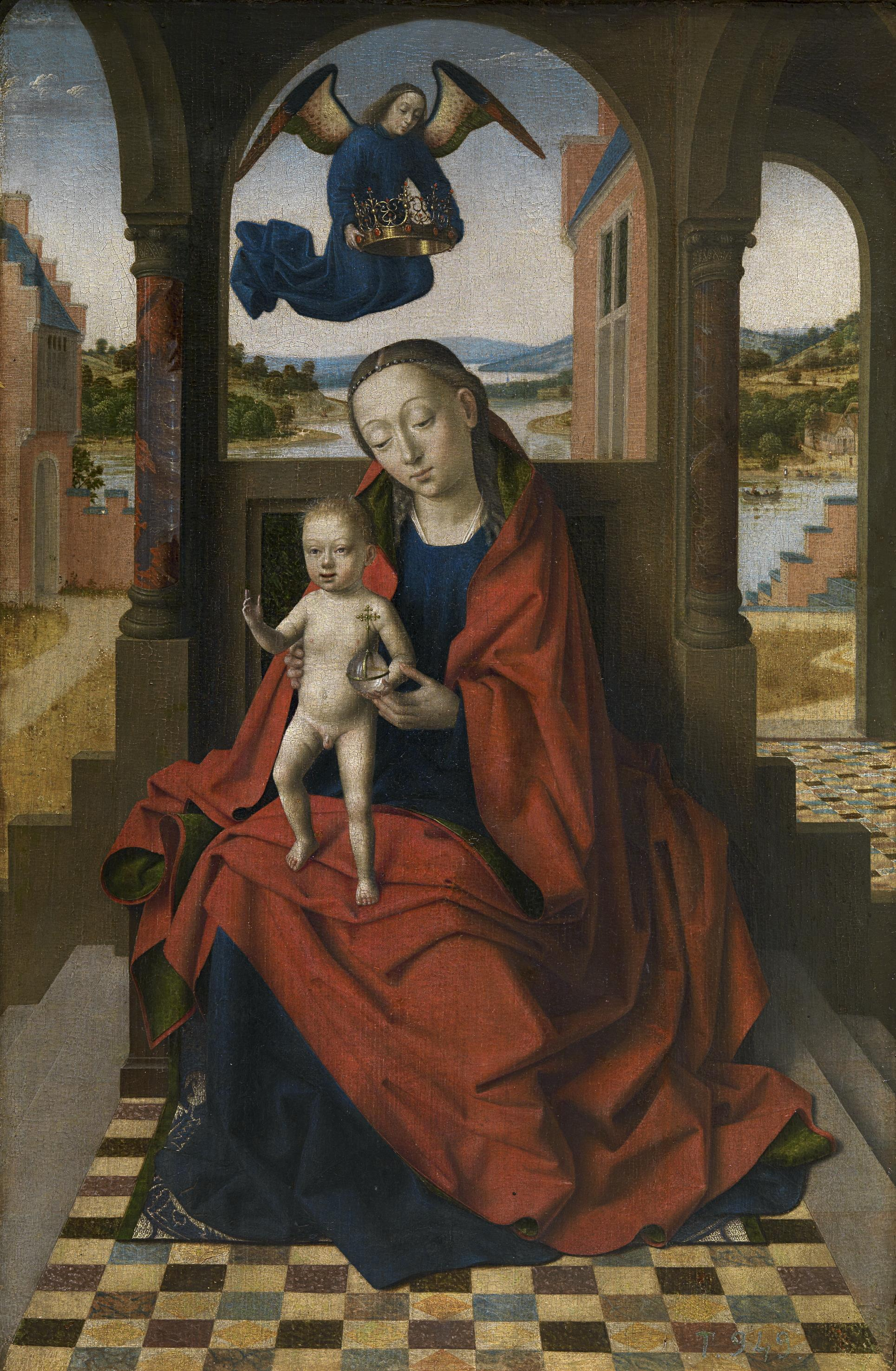
Madonna and Child, 1460–1465. Museo del Prado, Madrid

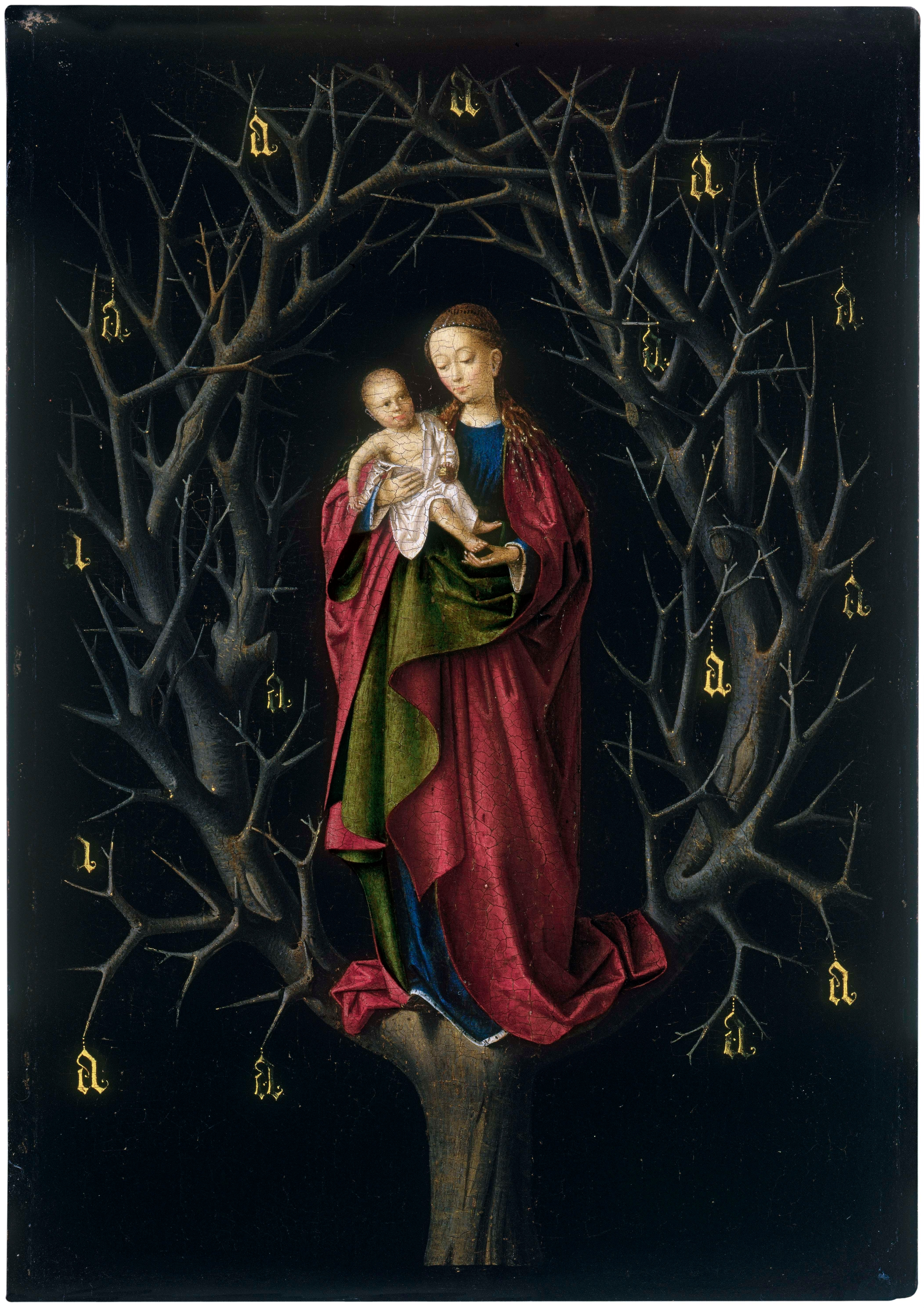
Madonna of the Dry Tree, c. 1462–1465. Thyssen-Bornemisza Museum, Madrid

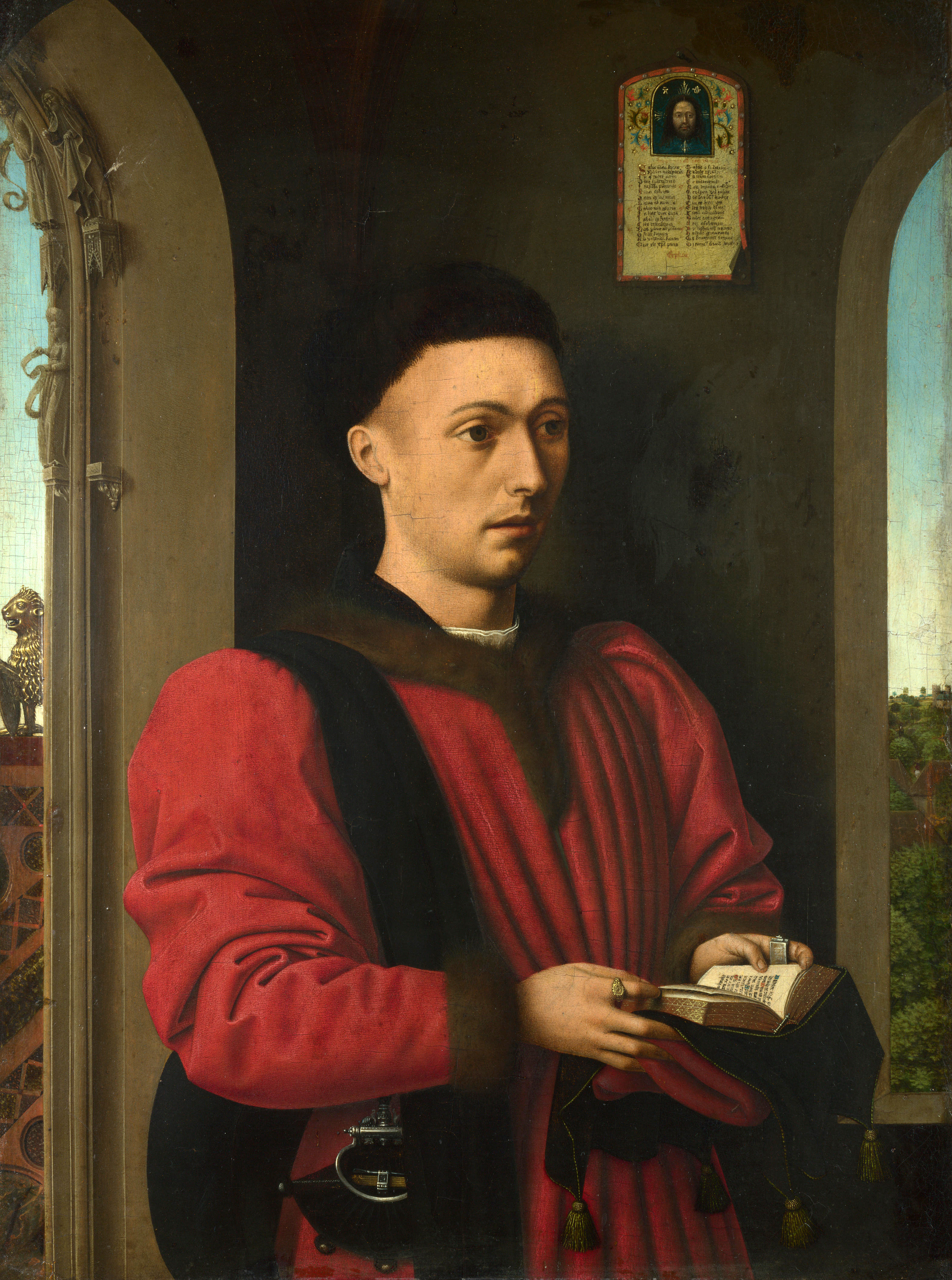
Portrait of a Young Man, c. 1450–1460. National Gallery, London

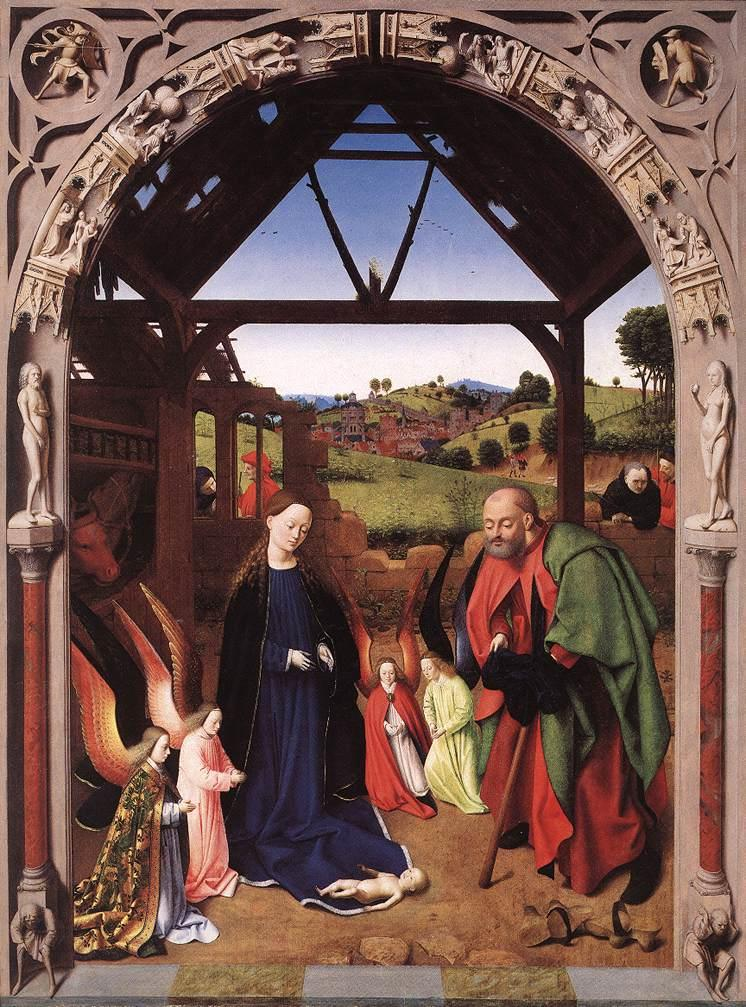
Nativity, c. 1460s. National Gallery of Art, Washington, D.C.
