= Pagagnotti Triptych =

Triptych by Hans Memling

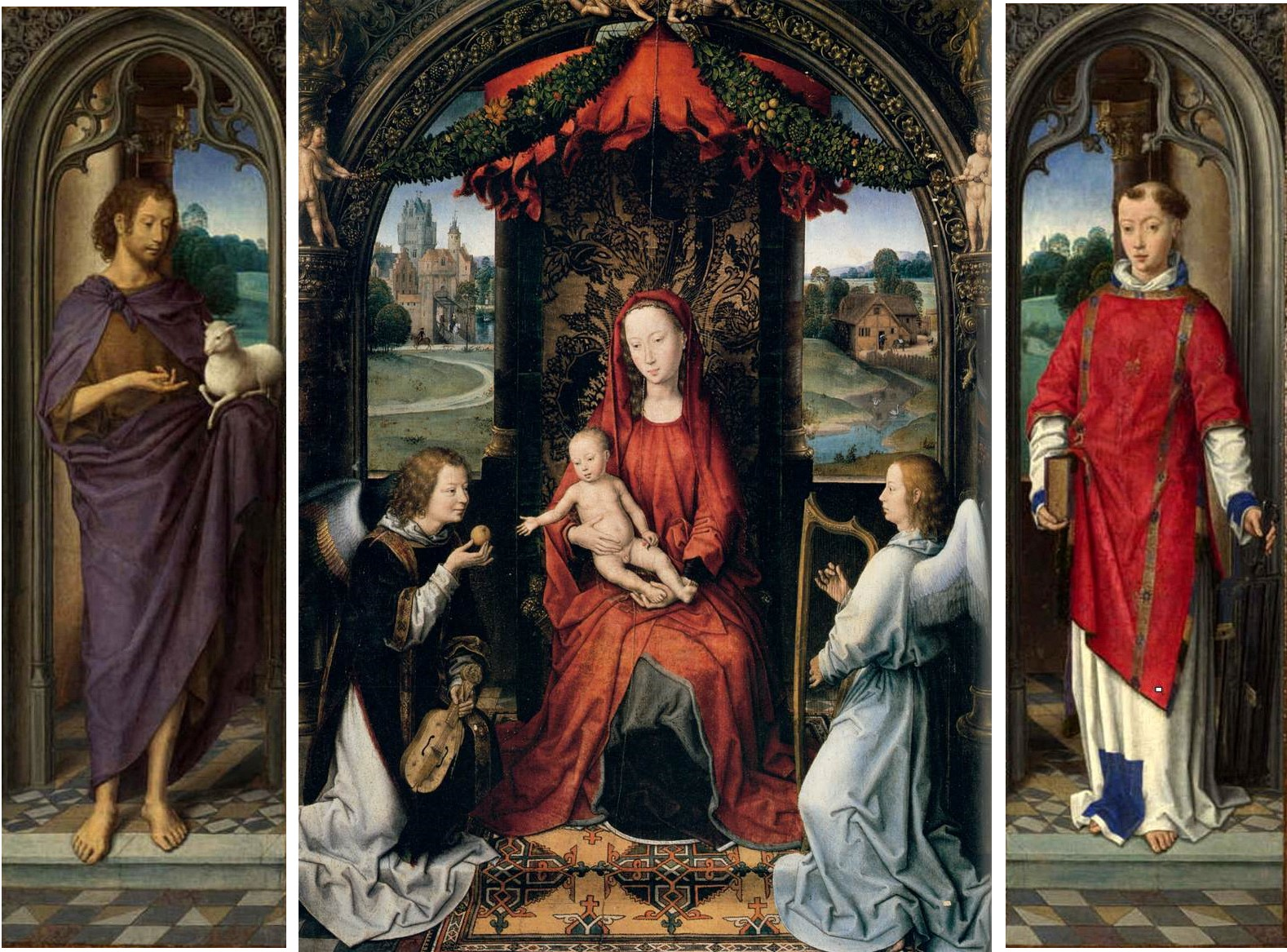
Pagagnotti Triptych, oil-on-panel, Hans Memling c. 1480, center, 57cm x 42cm; left, 57.5cm x 17.3cm; right, 57.5cm x 17.2cm

The Pagagnotti Triptych is a c. 1480 oil-on-wood triptych by the Early Netherlandish artist Hans Memling. The original was disassembled and separated, with the central panel now at the Uffizi gallery in Florence and the two wing panels at the National Gallery in London. The central Virgin and Child with two angels panel shows the enthroned Virgin holding the Child flanked by two angels. The left wing is a full-length portrait of St. John holding a lamb, while St. Lawrence stands in the right-hand panel holding a book.

In each panel, the figures are enclosed within archways and columns, and landscapes and buildings are visible through the rear openings. The painting was most likely commissioned by Bishop Benedetto Pagagnotti of Florence and, perhaps according to his instructions, Memling added elements more specific to contemporary Italian painting such as the festoons and putti above the Madonna. The reverse of both wings contains a highly unusual night scene of nine cranes standing beneath a coat of arms (presumably Pagagnotti's).

The art historian Paula Nuttall described the triptych as "a tour de force, pictorially, technically, and conceptually." Memling combined pictorial traditions and painterly techniques from Jan van Eyck and Rogier van der Weyden to evoke the sculptural representations with Italian all'antica influences and motifs. Elements from the painting, especially its background, were copied by Florentine artists such as Fra Filippino Lippi and Fra Bartolomeo. A similar triptych exists, executed by the Master of the Legend of St Ursula.

== Background and commission ==
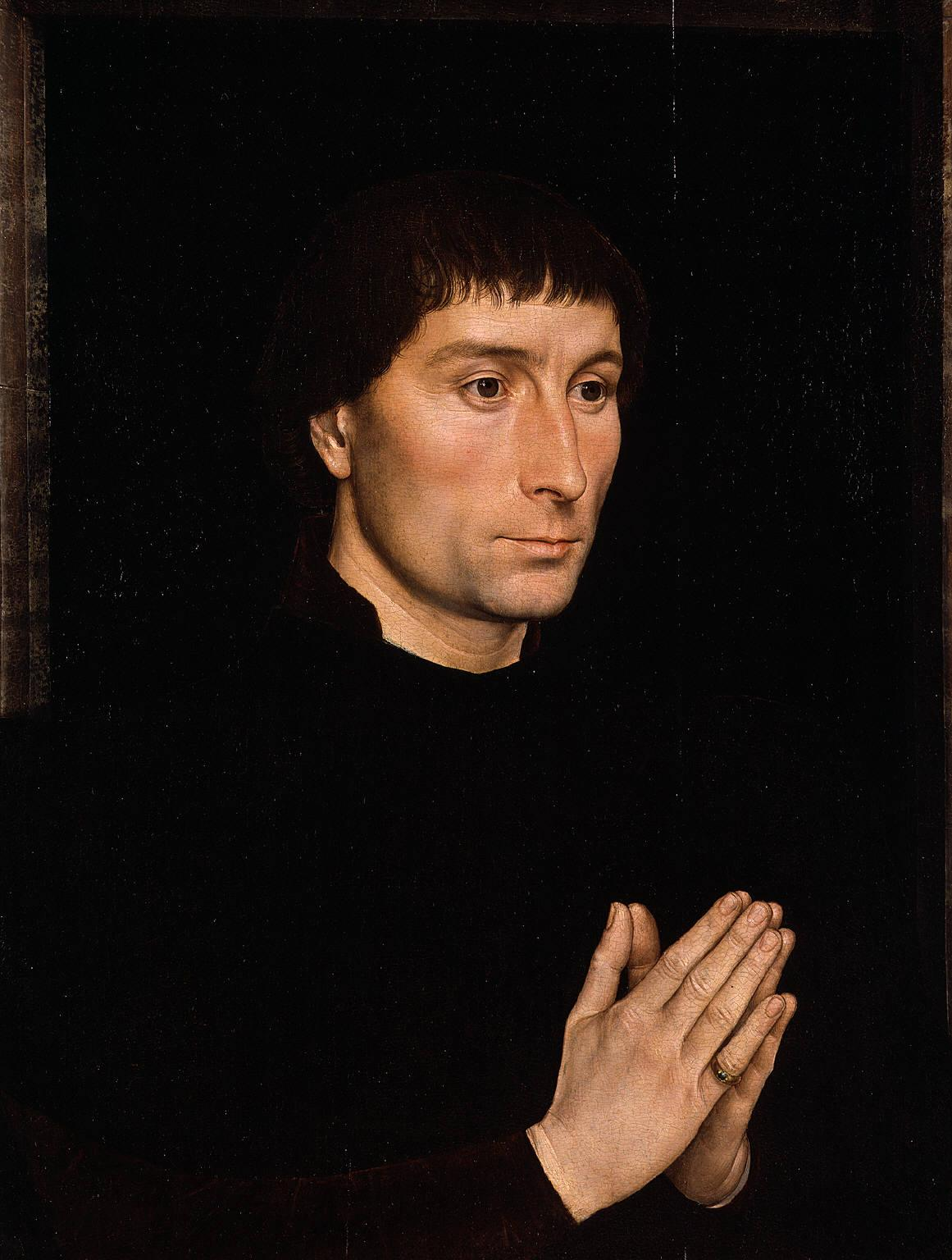
Portrait of Tommaso Portinari, c. 1470

In the 15th century, Early Netherlandish art was highly sought after by Italian collectors. With the strong commercial ties with Italy, Bruges had a branch of the Medici Bank and a large contingent of southern merchants. High numbers of paintings and other artworks were exported to Italy, their allure heightened as the Medici court acquired a substantial amount for their palaces. While stationed in Bruges, the Medici banker Tommaso Portinari commissioned the c. 1475 Portinari Altarpiece from Hugo van der Goes and had it transported to Florence for installation. He also commissioned Portrait of Tommaso Portinari and Portrait of Maria Portinari from Memling who was attracting cliental southern bankers and merchants attracted by his harmonious blending of Netherlandish with Italian techniques, styles and motifs.

The central Virgin and Child with Two Angels and the two wing panels were first identified as a Memling triptych by the art historian Michael Rohlmann in 1995. Based on the painting's coat-of-arms and the cranes on the reverse of the wing panels, Rohlmann established the original owner as the Florentine churchman Benedetto Pagagnotti, whose family were close associates of the Medici.

== Description ==
=== Exterior ===
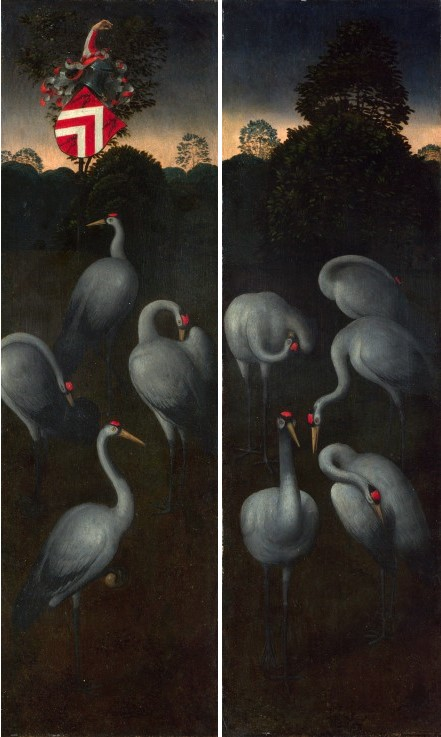
Closed view

The reverse of the wings become visible when the shutters are closed. They contain a representation of nine cranes st against a late evening landscape spread across the two panels. Dark trees rise against a late evening sky on the topmost edges; the sky fades to grey and then to pink on the farthest horizon, suggesting either sunset or sunrise. A small animal, perhaps a fox, is barely visible in the foliage on the left panel.

The left panel contains a coat of arms with red and white chevrons (a v-shaped mark) and a pair of compasses on its top corners, which are positioned above the cranes, against the fading sky.

The light-colored birds have bright red crests that match the coat of arms above. Rohlmann writes that "from out the landscape loom the shadowy grey form of the resting birds, their red crests shining out as isolated points of colour." Situated directly beneath the coat of arms, the foremost bird holds a stone in its claw, a reference to a classical story that sleeping cranes choose on in the flock to hold a stone; in the event of danger or if the bird falls asleep the stone is dropped, waking the entire flock. The guarding crane is known as grus vigilans, and are emblems of vigilance.

The cranes in a landscape is unusual for 15th-century Netherlandish triptychs; typically the doors, (or reverse panels), were painted in grisaille to represent statues of saints. Ainsworth describes the cranes as "emblematic"; Rohlmann as "fascinating". Art historians are undecided whether the scene is by Memling or members of his workshop. Ainsworth considers it "weak in execution" and the art historian Oliver Hand suggests the flock of birds signify participation by a number of workshop members.

=== Interior ===
The Virgin and Child are represented in a space filled with elaborate architectural details of Italian origin. Mary is seated on her throne holding Jesus on her lap, beneath a canopy of honor decorated in characteristic Memling fashion with swags of red fabric. There are two columns to each side of the throne, two flanking the throne, and the capitals of two others are visible at each edge of the space. The throne is positioned beneath a decorated arch, on which cherubs (putto) are perched holding garlands. Two angels holding musical instruments kneel to side and at front of the throne.

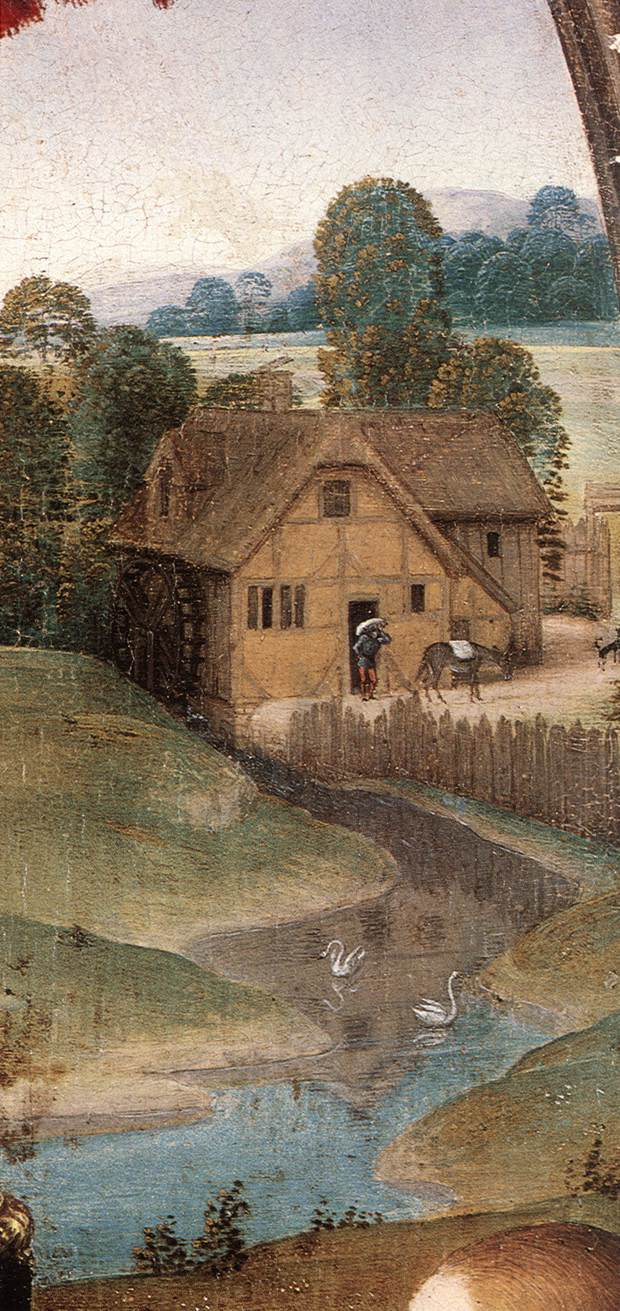
Detail of landscape with a mill, center panel

Netherlandish motifs are combined and blended with Italiante all'antica motifs. The central panel rear columns are in a barley twisted design and gilded; their capitals supporting sculptures – Samson killing the lion on the left; Cain slaying Abel on the right. The other columns, those supporting the putti and those seemingly part of Mary's throne are rendered in a dark reddish marble hue, seen in Netherlandish art since Jan van Eyck, but unlike van Eyck, Memling's have gilded bases and capitals, in the Italian fashion.

Spatial and temporal borders separating the earthly and heavenly spheres are often seen in Netherlandish art, usually in the form of frames or arches. A boundary is in achieved Petrus Christus's Nativity with the grisaille archway, with the Holy Family placed firmly behind the arch in the sacred space, beyond the secular and earthly realm. Memling's use of arches tends more towards the decorative; rather than indicating separation of heavenly and earthly spaces, they simply float within a space as a design element. The arch floating above the Virgin and Child exhibits a number of Italianate all'antica motifs. The outer rim consists of half rosettes and the inner rim is decorated on the one side with a grape vine (symbol of the eucharist) and the other side with ivy. Although gilded, resembling polished metal (or perhaps sculpture), the art historian Paula Nuttall writes that the plants "are concomitantly a tour de force of naturalistic observation, with their curling tendrils and delicate roots, as are the two pairs of snail and a lizard beneath them".

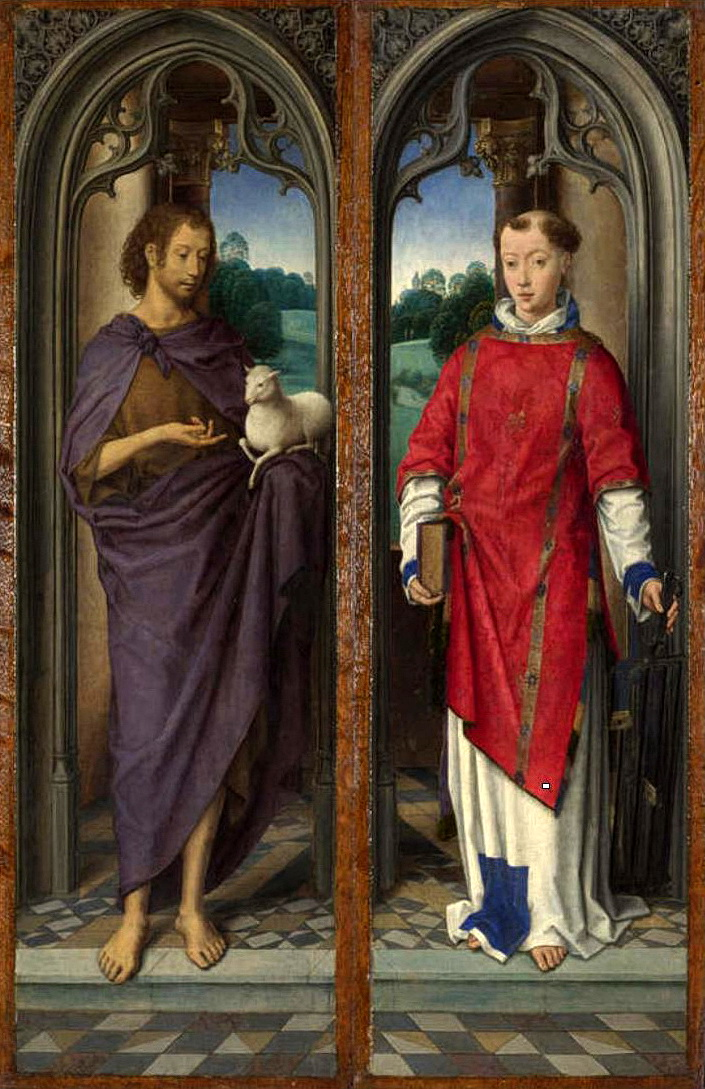
Saints John and Lawrence

The left wing shows St. John the Baptist with his emblem of a Lamb; the right shows St. Lawrence with a book and his instruments of torture. St. John is dressed in a hair shirt and mantle; the saint is almost identical to Memling's St. John in the Donne Triptych and similar to figure in the center panel of the St John Altarpiece. St. Lawrence is dressed in a white alb and a red dalmatic. St. Lawrence is rarely depicted in Netherlandish art or by Memling, suggesting that the buyer requested and approved the specific figure.

The standing saints are enclosed in an architectural frame representing the tracery of Gothic windows; columns with Corinthian capitals are barely visible adjacent to the windows at the back. The architectural details are a juxtaposition of northern and southern motif and influences. Through the windows are landscapes, which were emulated by Italian artists. A tondo by Biagio d'Antonio cites specific portions of the landscapes of the wing panels.

== Identification and attribution ==
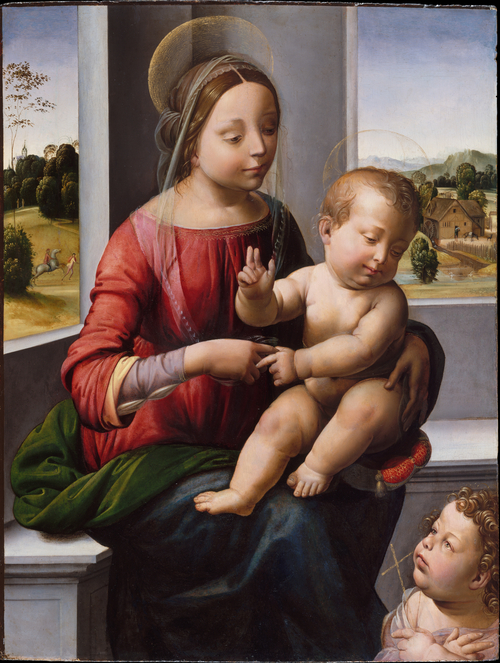
Fra Bartolomeo's Madonna and Child (c. 1497), New York

In 1995, the art historian Michael Rohlman identified the two narrow panels at the National Gallery and the Uffizi central panel as the separated pieces of triptych by Memling. The identification was based on comparisons between identical dimensions of the London wing panels and the Uffizi central panel; the position of the floor tiles and steps; and similar all'antica architectural motifs across the panels. The positioning of the step and the floor tiles ran across the three panels of original triptych, giving the appearance of a continuous space.

The background landscapes, which were copied by Italian painters, aided in the identification. As early as 1483 the center panel's mill with the man carrying a sack of flour was copied in Filippino Lippi's painting of Saints Paul and Frediano. Fra Bartolomeo's New York Madonna and Child (c. 1497) depicts an almost identical rendition of the mill and elements of the landscape from the St. Lawrence panel.

The elaborate garlands, the number of putti, and the cranes on the exterior view are uncommon motifs in Memling's oeuvre, probably executed according to the client's tastes or specifications. Rohlman traced the distinctive heraldic devices and identified the coat-of-arms as belonging the Florentine Pagagnotti family. The same coat-of-arms is found in another Netherlandish triptych, by the Master of the Legend of St Ursula, which Rohlman identified as commissioned by Paulo Pagagnotti (based on the presence of St Paul on the left wing). Paulo traveled more than once to Bruges as an agent for the Medici, and Rohlmann believes the Memling triptych was commissioned for Paulo's uncle Benedetto, Bishop of Vaison, who resided in a large apartment in Santa Maria Novella, in Florence.

== Sources ==
- Ainsworth, Maryan "The Business of Art: Patrons, Clients and Art Markets". Maryann Ainsworth, et al.(eds.) From van Eyck to Bruegel: Early Netherlandish Painting in the Metropolitan Museum of Art. (1998). Metropolitan Museum, New York. ISBN 0-87099-871-4
- Meiss, Millard. "A New Monumental Painting by Filippino Lippi". The Art Bulletin, vol. 55, no. 4, 1973, pp. 479–93, JSTOR 3049160.
- Birkmeyer, Karl M. "The Arch Motif in Netherlandish Painting of the Fifteenth Century: A Study in Changing Religious Imagery". The Art Bulletin, Vol. 43, No. 2, (Jun., 1961)
- Christiansen, Keith. "The View from Italy". Maryan Ainsworth, et al. (eds.) From van Eyck to Bruegel: Early Netherlandish Painting in the Metropolitan Museum of Art. (1998). Metropolitan Museum, New York. ISBN 0-87099-871-4
- Chapuis, Julien. "Early Netherlandish Painting: Shifting Perspectives". Maryan Ainsworth, et al. (eds.), From Van Eyck to Bruegel: Early Netherlandish Painting in the Metropolitan Museum of Art. New York: Metropolitan Museum of Art, (1998). ISBN 0-87099-871-4
- Hand, John Oliver; Metzger, Catherine; Spronk, Ron. Prayers and Portraits: Unfolding the Netherlandish Diptych. New Haven, CT: Yale University Press, 2006. ISBN 0-300-12155-5
- Nuttall, Paula. "Memling's Pagagnotti 'Virgin and Child'": Italian Renaissance Sculpture Reimagined. Sculptures Journal, vol 26. Issue 1, 2017, pp 25–36
- Rohlmann, Michael. "Memling's 'Pagagnotti Triptych'". The Burlington Magazine, vol. 137, no. 1108, 1995, pp. 438–445. JSTOR 886499. Accessed 16 July 2021.
