= Portrait of Maria Portinari =

C. 1470–72 painting by Hans Memling

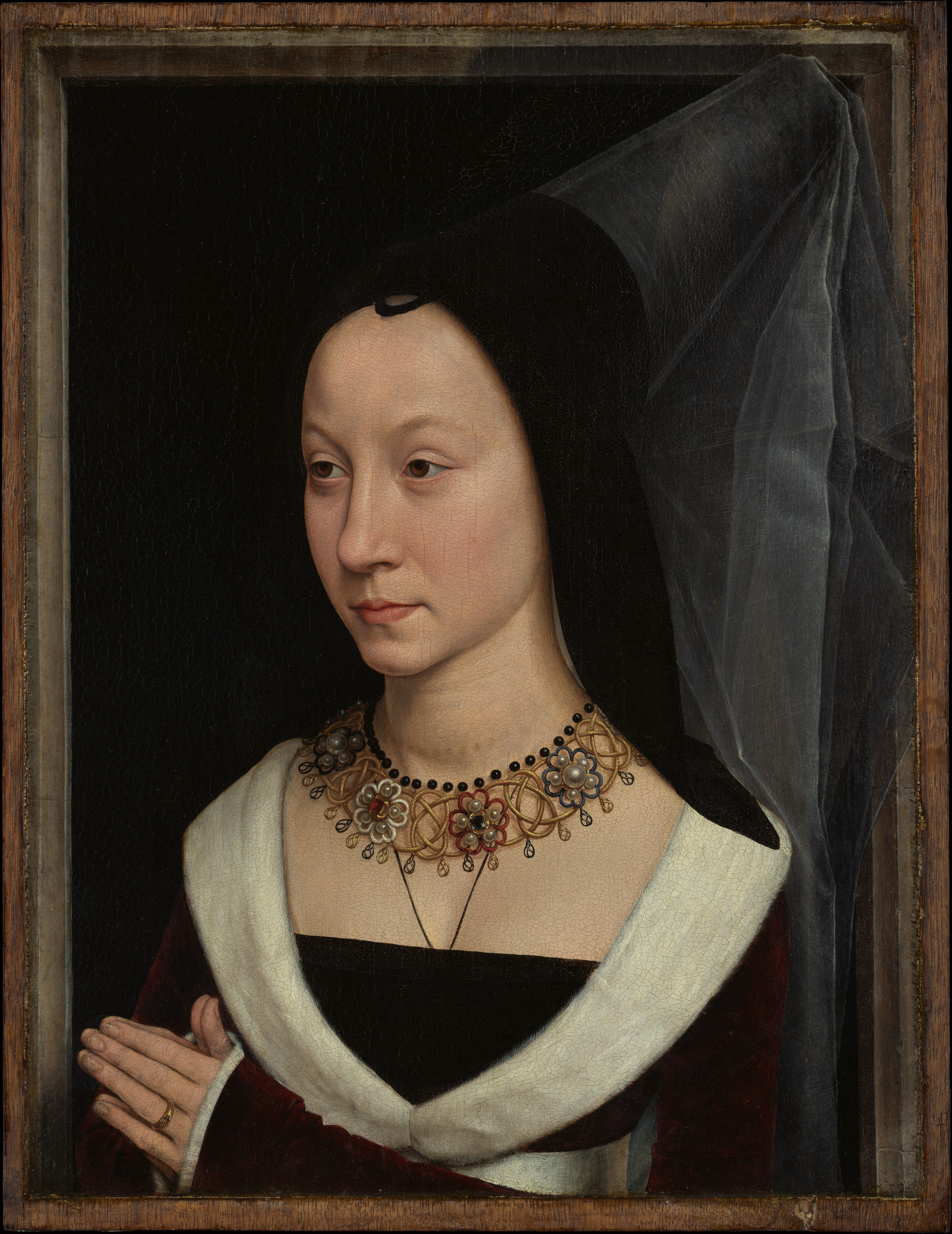
- Artist: Hans Memling
- Year: c. 1470
- Type: Oil on oak panel
- Dimensions: 44.1 cm × 34 cm (17.4 in × 13 in)
- Location: Metropolitan Museum of Art, New York City

Portrait of Maria Portinari is a small c. 1470 painting by Hans Memling in tempera and oil on oak panel. It portrays Maria Maddalena Baroncelli, about whom very little is known. She is about 14 years old, and depicted shortly before her wedding to the Italian banker, Tommaso Portinari. Maria is dressed in the height of late fifteenth-century fashion, with a long black hennin with a transparent veil and an elaborate jewel-studded necklace. Her headdress is similar and a necklace identical to those in her depiction in Hugo van der Goes's later Portinari Altarpiece (c. 1475), a painting that may have been partly based on Memling's portrait.

The panel is the right wing of a devotional and hinged triptych; the lost center panel is recorded in sixteenth-century inventories as a Virgin and Child, and the left panel depicts Tommaso. The panels were commissioned by Tommaso, a member of a prominent Florentine family. Tommaso was a confidant of Charles the Bold and an ambitious manager of the Bruges branch of a bank controlled by Lorenzo de' Medici, and a well known and active patron of Flemish art. Tommaso eventually lost his position due to a series of large and risky unsecured loans given to Charles.

Maria and Tommaso's portraits hang alongside each other at the Metropolitan Museum of Art in New York. The central panel is lost; some art historians suggest it may have been his Virgin and Child in the National Gallery, London.

== Commission ==
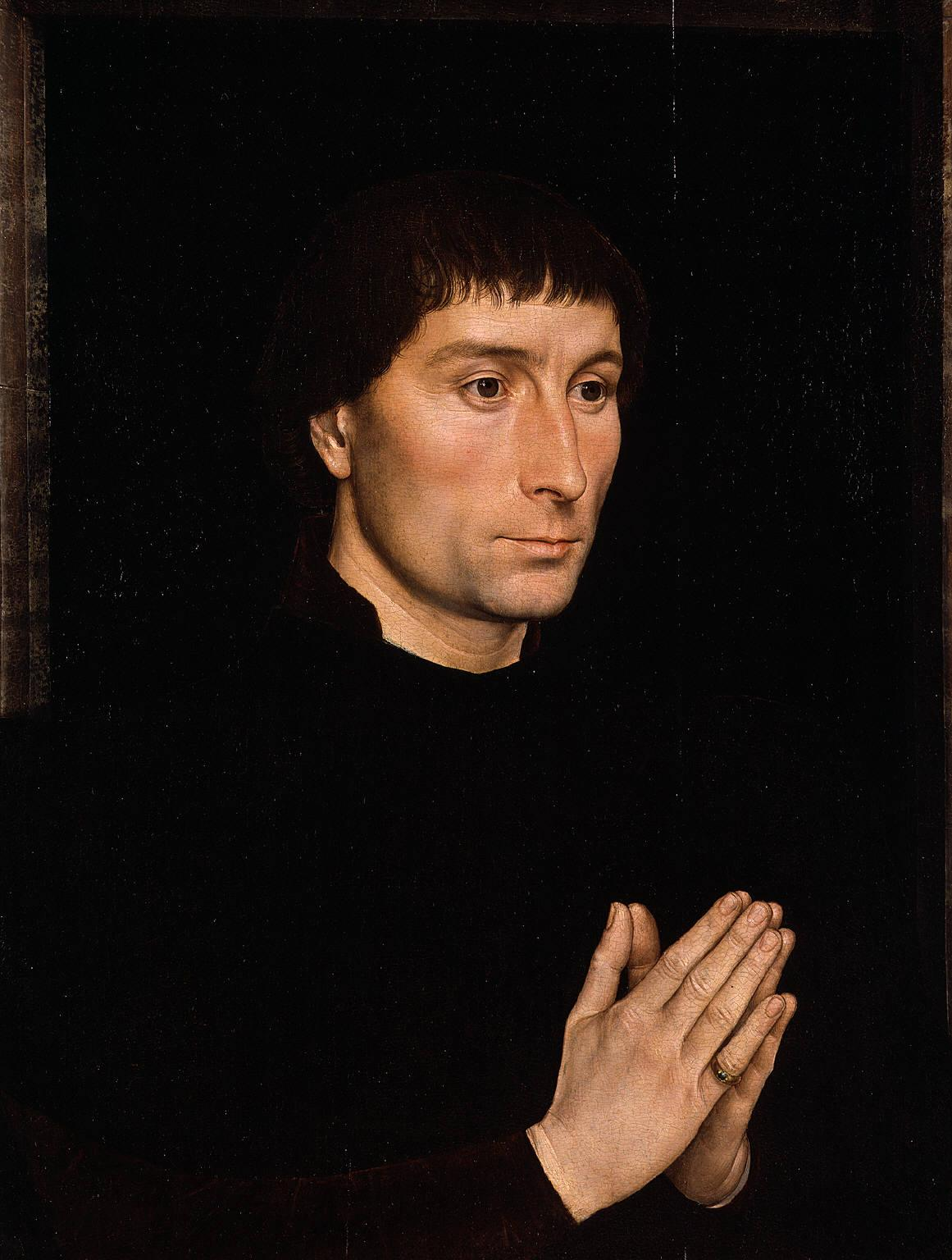
Portrait of Tommaso Portinari, c. 1470. Metropolitan Museum of Art, New York

The portrait was commissioned by the art-loving Tommaso as the right-hand wing of a triptych. She was placed opposite her husband, with a now-lost central Madonna and Child. Their small size and intimacy suggest that the portraits were commissioned for private prayer; some art historians believe, given Tommaso's cultural acumen and preoccupation with his social standing, that they were partially accessible to the public. The triptych may have been intended for the Portinari Chapel, located behind the apse of the Basilica of Sant'Eustorgio, Milan, and constructed between 1462 and 1468.

Maria would have been around 14 years old at the time the portrait was commissioned, either the year of her marriage in 1470 or shortly after. Tommaso represented the Medici bank in Bruges, but after a promising early career he gave a number of risky and unsecured loans to Charles the Bold which were left unpaid and eventually led to the branch's insolvency. He died young, and when the portrait was first mentioned as part of his collection in 1501, he was no longer alive. Maria is recorded as being alive at the time; she was executor to her husband's will but her fate thereafter is uncertain. The 1501 inventory places both portraits as wings, with a central Virgin and Child panel; "a small, valuable panel painting, with an image of Our Lady in the middle and on the sides painted Tommaso and mona Maria his wife" (una tavoletta dipinta preg[i]ata cum nel mezo una immagine di Nostra Donna e delle bande si è Tommaso e mona Maria sua donna dipinti in deta tavoletta).

== Description ==
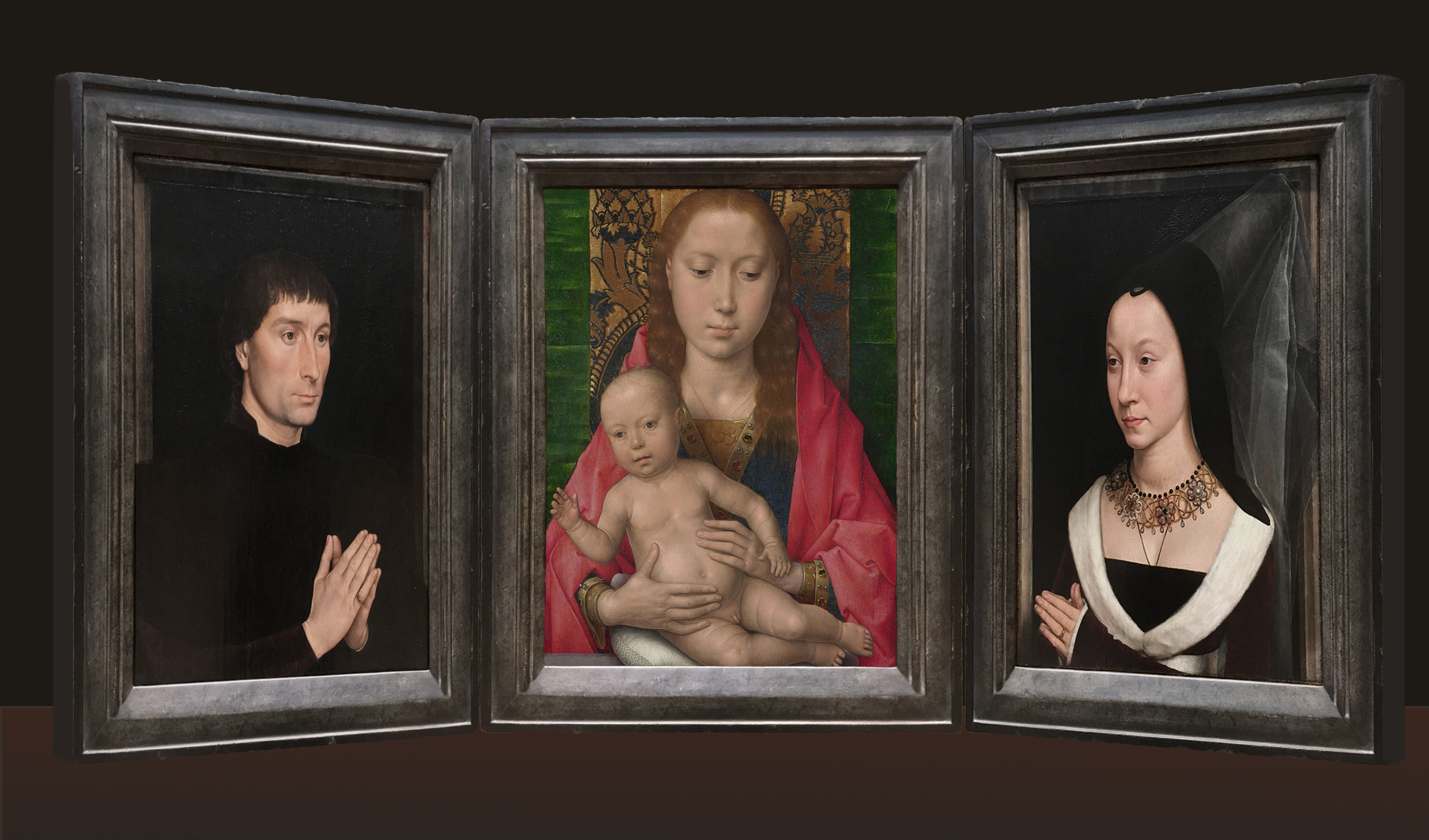
Speculative reconstruction of the original triptych, with a Virgin and Child at centre

The half-length portrait shows Maria Portinari (born Maria Maddalena Baroncelli in 1456) in a three-quarter view turned to the left. She has somewhat Nordic features, and is dressed in the high fashion then found at the apex of Flemish and Italian high society. She is placed against a flat, opaque, dark background, with her hands clasped in prayer. In Memling's early portraits, the backgrounds tend to be plain, as was invariably the case in the work of Jan van Eyck and Rogier van der Weyden, and favoured within Burgundian court circles. In contrast, Memling's later portraits are set within rich interiors or against landscapes framed by columns, such as in his Benedetto Portinari Triptych, a fact that has assisted in dating his work.

Maria's face is idealised and conforms to contemporary ideals of beauty, especially in the raised eyebrows and elongated nose. The art historian Lorne Campbell has noted her facial similarity to the Virgin in Memling's panel at the National Museum of Ancient Art, Lisbon. In this work, Maria's frame is slightly undersized compared to her head, a common characteristic of contemporary northern portraiture, also found in similar works by Rogier van der Weyden and Petrus Christus. Her elbows rest on an unseen parapet that coincides with the lower edge of the painted stone frame, acting as a trompe-l'œil which situates her both in the same reality and in closer proximity to the viewer. Maria wears a relatively modest wedding band lined with rubies and sapphire. Her necklace is colored with mostly red and blue jewels, similar to Hugo van der Goes's portrait of her in the Portinari Altarpiece.

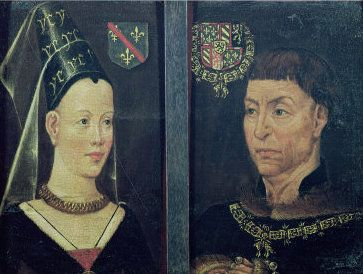
Double Portrait of Charles the Bold and Isabella of Bourbon. Unknown artist, 16th c. Museum of Fine Arts, Ghent

The black hennin is long, truncated and relatively plain with a transparent veil which falls around the back of her neck, resting briefly on her shoulder. Probably it was kept relatively unadorned to avoid distracting from the necklace. Her costume is mostly black or brown, with a wide, high neckline and white fur-lined sleeves. Portinari has dark eyes, a strong nose, full lips and a pointed chin. Her visible hand, folded in prayer but unrealistically off centre, wears what looks like a jewelled ring. The dark sleeves of her dress are made of red or rouge-velvet-like cloth, tightened by a white belt. Her hair is shaved back to achieve the high forehead and sculptural look fashionable at the time.

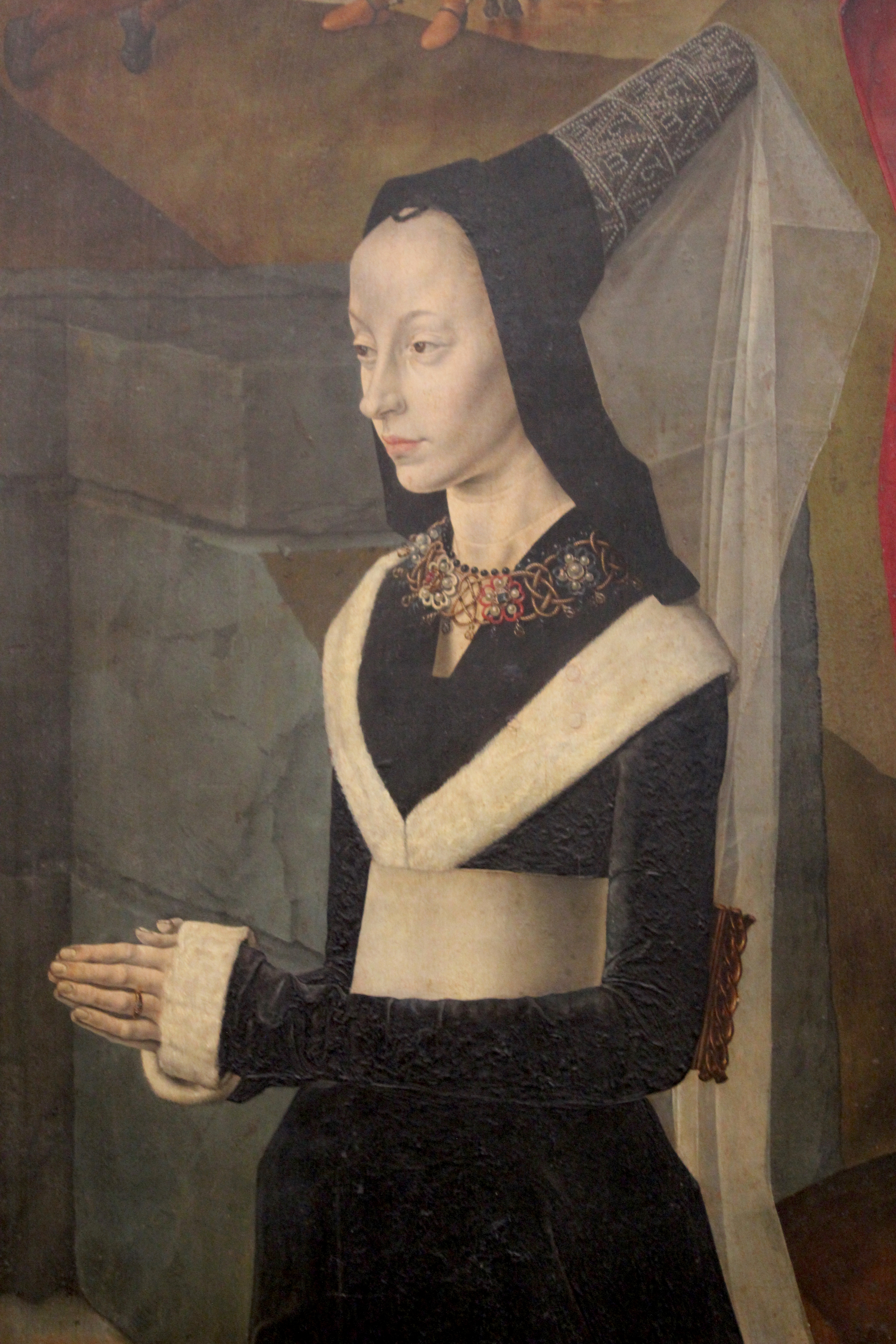
Detail from Hugo van der Goes's c. 1475 Portinari Altarpiece, Uffizi, Florence

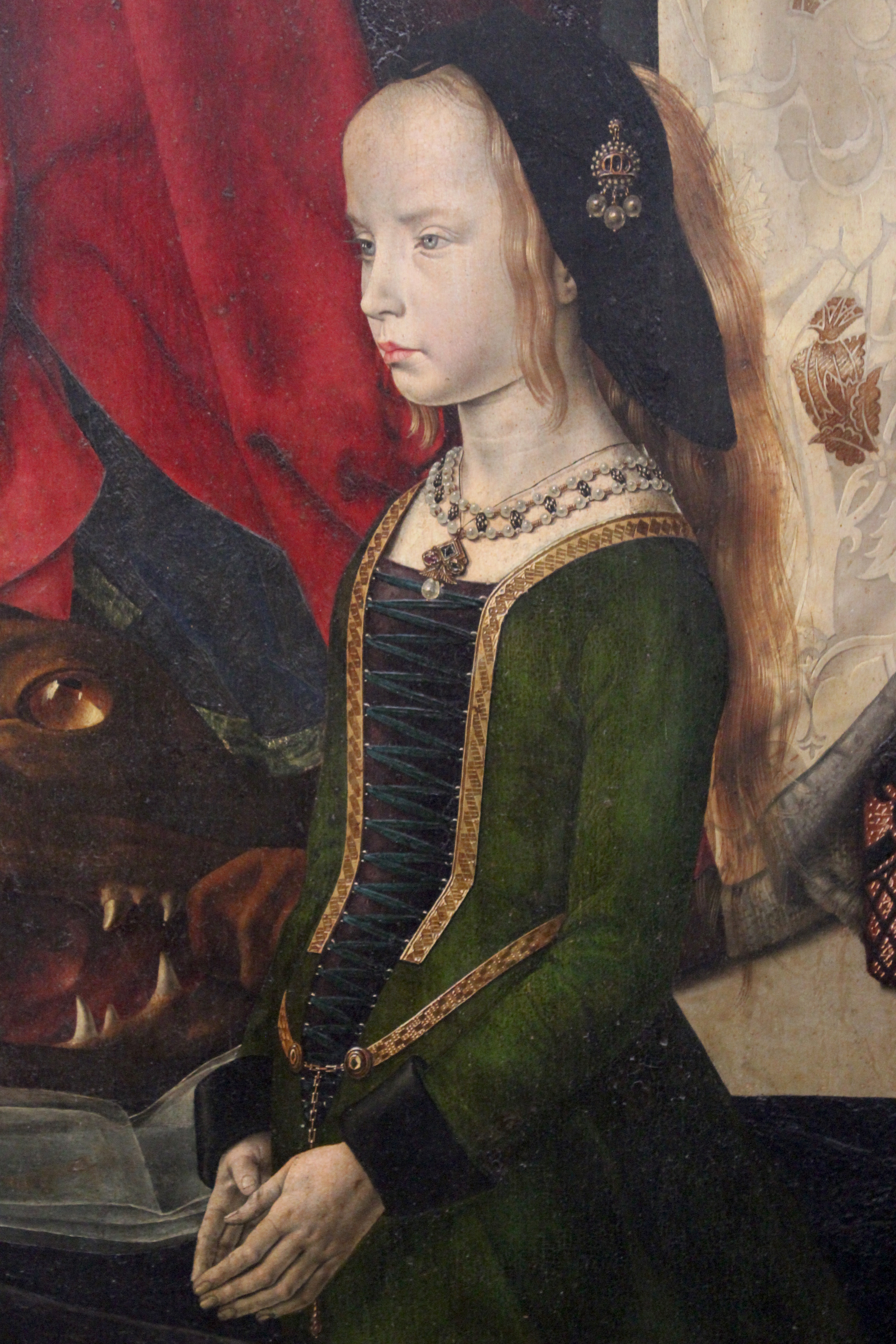
Detail from the Portinari Altarpiece showing the couple's daughter Margarita. Note the similar stare, demeanor and hennin

Maria's necklace is gilded and studded with pearls, rubies and sapphires. It contains three open flowers; one white with a ruby jewel, another red with a sapphire, and one gray-blue with a pearl. The upper line contains a row of onyx beads, from which hang, according to the art historian Sophie McConnell "small teardrops" gold and bluish-grey enameled wire. The necklace is very similar to that worn by Margaret of York at her wedding to Charles the Bold in 1468, an occasion the Portinaris attended. A depiction of Charles in a double Portrait with Isabella of Bourbon, now in Ghent, closely resembles that of Thomas in facial features, while Isabella and Maria look very similar. Dirk de Vos believes van der Goes may have seen Memling's panel when he stayed with Tommaso in Bruges c. 1497, and incorporated elements for his own depiction.

The panel is in very good condition and among the best preserved of Memling's work. Technical examination using x-radiography shows that the hennin originally contained pearls which formed the letters "T" and "M", standing for Tommaso and Maria. Similar pearl monograms, which would have been intended as a sign of marital connection, can be found in van der Goes's portraits of the couple. Maryan Ainsworth concludes that they were removed from the final composition as they may have been "deemed too conspicuous a show of opulence in the presence of the Virgin and Child, most likely the now lost object of Maria's veneration." Maria's ear was at one stage exposed, but was later covered by the wide frontlet of the hennin, a change of mind also found in the very similar portrait of the female donor in Memling's c. 1470s to early 1480 Donne Triptych.

== Provenance ==
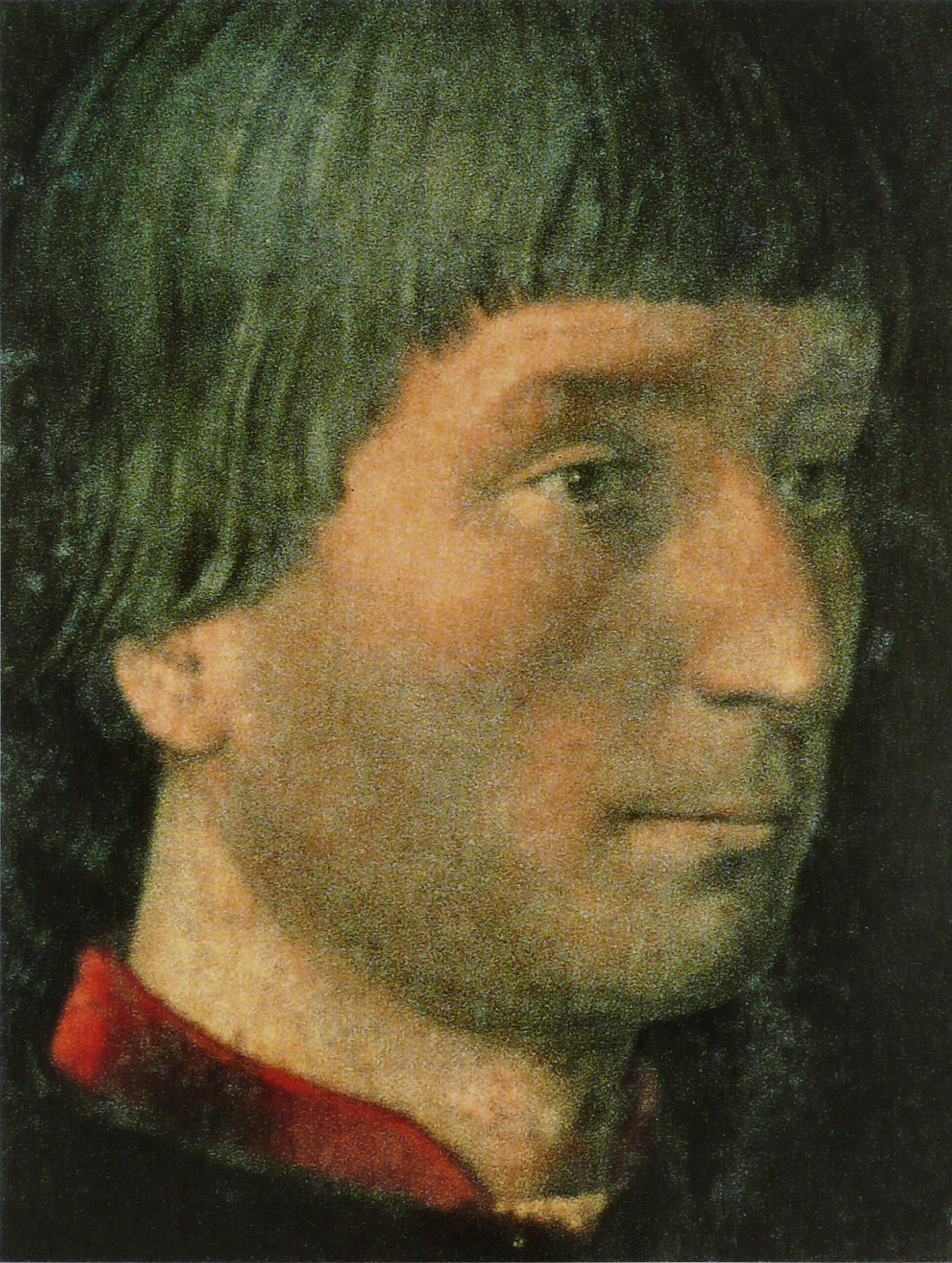
Detail of Hugo's portrait of Tommaso, c. 1470

The panel has at various times been attributed to van der Goes and van Eyck, but was recognized as by Memling as early as the time of the seminal 1902 exhibition Exposition des primitifs flamands à Bruges in Bruges, when it was lent by Léopold Goldschmidt of Paris. In 1916 Max J. Friedländer described it as "without doubt" by Memling, and c. 1475. The art historian Catheline Périer-d'Ieteren, while noting that Memling's portrait faces were rarely underdrawn, wrote that this panel contains "thin yet confident incised lines" which may be preliminary drawings for Maria's face, perhaps made from life.

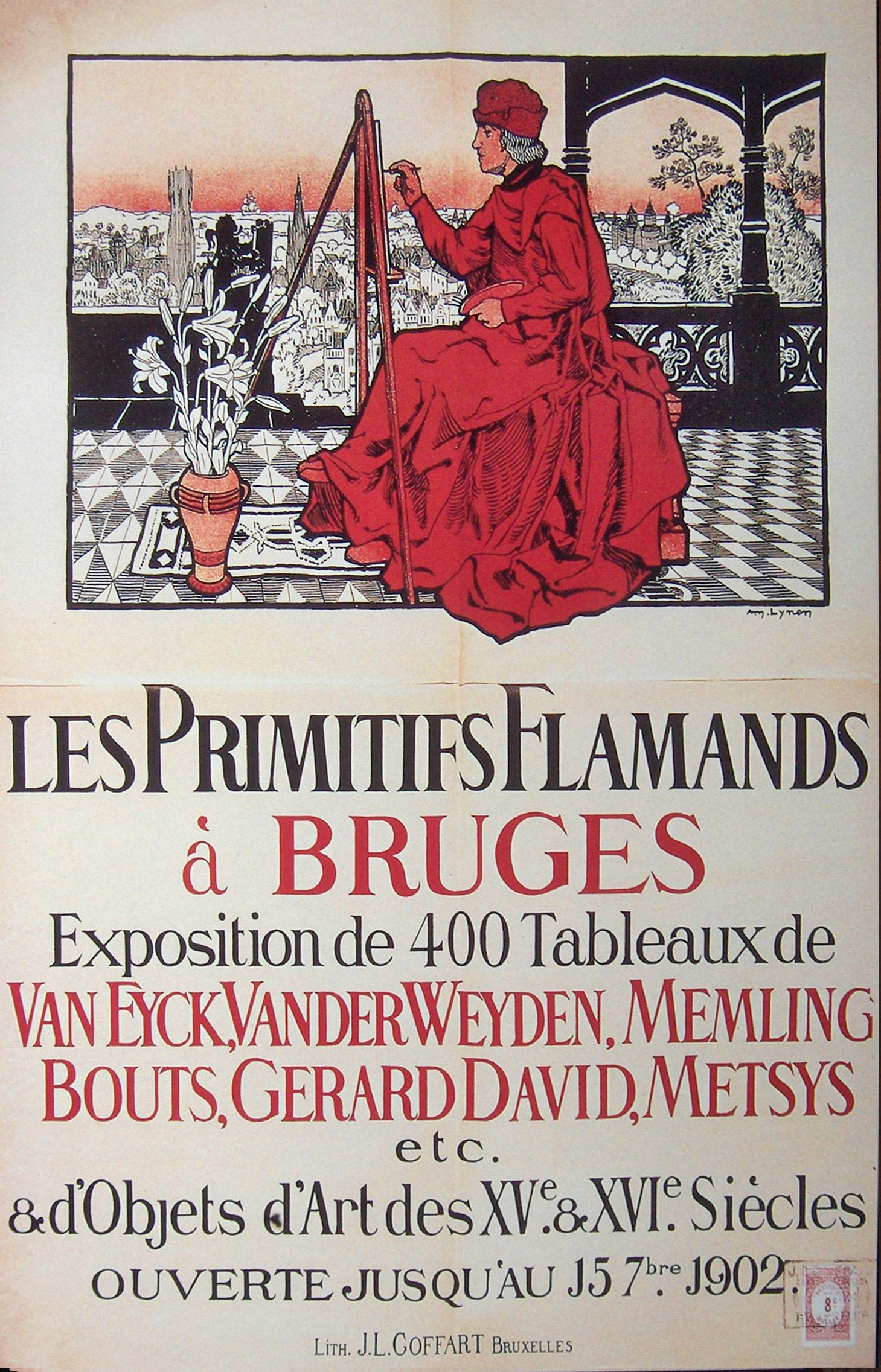
Exposition des primitifs flamands à Bruges

The triptych was recorded in an inventory of Tommaso's holdings upon his death. The New York panels passed through Tommaso's son Francesco. The central panel was described in his 1544 will as "a small tabernacle with three movable wings, in which is depicted the glorious Virgin Mary and the father and mother of the donor" (unum tabernaculettum que clauditur con tribus sportellis, in qua est depicta imago Gloriossime virginis Marie et patris et matris dicti testatoris). Francesco bequeathed the triptych to the convent of the hospital of Santa Maria Nuova in Florence. Records indicate a small intact winged altarpiece which stayed in the hospital's possession until around the time of the Napoleonic occupation, when it was probably broken up.

Maria's panel was sold as a Dieric Bouts for 6,000 francs in 1870. It later passed through several private collections before arriving in the possession of Elia Volpi of Rome, who briefly returned it to Florence. Thereafter the panels were in London from 1901, from where they were sold to Villeroy Goldschmidt of Paris by for $426,500 in 1910. They were purchased, also in 1910, by the collector Benjamin Altman of New York on the advice of Max Friedländer, along with works by Albrecht Dürer, Gerard David and Hans Holbein the Younger – paintings whose "grave austerity seems to have been most in tune with his own taste". Altman bequeathed his holdings to the Metropolitan on his death in 1913.

== Sources ==
- Ainsworth, Maryan. Hans Memling as a Draughtsman, in Hans Memling: Essays (ed. Dirk De Vos). Ghent, 1994. ISBN 978-90-5544-030-6
- Ainsworth, Maryan. From Van Eyck to Bruegel: Early Netherlandish Paintings in the Metropolitan Museum of Art. New York: Metropolitan Museum of Art, 2009. ISBN 978-0-87099-870-6
- Burn, Barbara. Masterpieces of the Metropolitan Museum of Art. New York: Bulfinch Press, 1997. ISBN 978-0-87099-849-2
- Campbell, Lorne. Renaissance Portraits. Princeton: Princeton University Press, 1990. ISBN 978-0-300-04675-5
- Campbell, Lorne. The Fifteenth Century Netherlandish Schools. London: National Gallery Publications, 1998. ISBN 978-1-85709-171-7
- De Vos, Dirk. Hans Memling: The Complete Works. Ghent: Harry N Abrams, 1994. ISBN 978-0-8109-3649-2
- Franke, Susanne. "Between Status and Spiritual Salvation: The Portinari Triptych and Tommaso Portinari's Concern for His Memoria". Simiolus: Netherlands Quarterly for the History of Art, vol. 33 no. 3, 2007
- Friedländer, Max J. "The Altman Memlings at the Metropolitan Museum of Art". Art in America 4, no. 4, 1916
- Grössinger, Christa. Picturing women in late Medieval and Renaissance art. Manchester: Manchester University Press, 1997. ISBN 978-0-7190-4109-9
- Haskell, Francis. "The Benjamin Altman Bequest". New York: Metropolitan Museum Journal, vol. 3, 1970
- McConnell, Sophie. Metropolitan Jewelry Archived 2016-06-18 at the Wayback Machine. New York: Metropolitan Museum of Art, 1991. ISBN 978-0-300-04675-5
- Nash, Susie. Northern Renaissance art. Oxford: Oxford University Press, 2008. ISBN 978-0-19-284269-5
- Panofsky, Erwin. Early Netherlandish Painting. London: HarperCollins, 1953. ISBN 978-0-06-430002-5
- Périer-d'Ieteren, Catheline. Dieric Bouts: The Complete Works. Brussels: Thames & Hudson, 2006. ISBN 978-90-6153-638-3
- Waldman, Louis Alexander. "New Documents for Memling's Portinari Portraits in the Metropolitan Museum of Art". Apollo, no. 153, February 2001
- Wehle, Harry. "Maria Portinari" Archived 2019-08-06 at the Wayback Machine. The Metropolitan Museum of Art Bulletin, vol. 11 no. 5, January 1953
