= Portinari =

Portinari may refer to:

- Beatrice Portinari (1266–1290), muse of Dante
- Candido Portinari (1903–1962), Brazilian painter
- Giovanni Portinari (fl.1508-1572), Anglo-Italian military engineer
- Tommaso Portinari (c.1424–1501), Florentine banker
- Portinari Triptych, a painting by Hugo van der Goes
- Portinari Chapel, in the Basilica of Sant'Eustorgio, Milan
