= Triptych of the Annunciation =

Triptych by the Master of the Legend of Saint Ursula

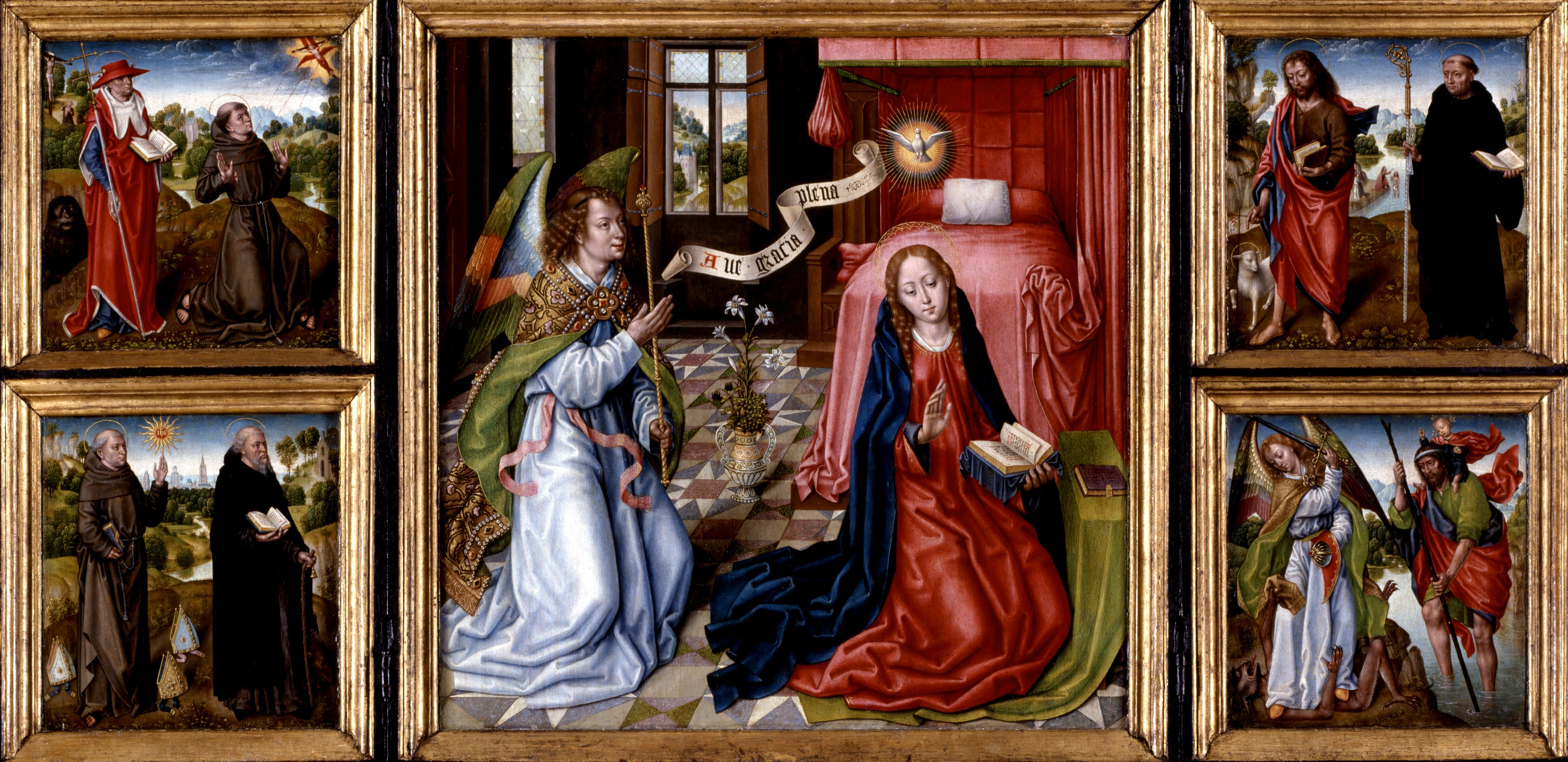
- Artist: Master of the Legend of Saint Ursula
- Year: 1483
- Type: Oil on panel triptych
- Dimensions: 59.1 cm × 116.2 cm (23.25 in × 45.75 in)
- Location: Indianapolis Museum of Art, Indianapolis

Triptych of the Annunciation is a 1483 triptych by the Flemish artist known only as the Master of the Legend of Saint Ursula from another work, on display in the US Indianapolis Museum of Art. It depicts the Annunciation on the central panel, while the surrounding panels and the outside of the wings are covered in various pairs of male saints.

== Description ==
The artist's mastery of oil painting is evident in this beautifully-preserved triptych. His craftsmanship made him one of the premiere painters in late fifteenth-century Bruges.

The central panel of this triptych shows the moment of the Annunciation, as the Archangel Gabriel interrupts Mary's prayers to announce her selection. His vestments link Gabriel to the Mass, and so tie the Annunciation itself to the sacraments. His banner reads Ave Gratia Plena (Hail, full of grace), the first words of his salutation to her. The dove hovering over Mary's head symbolizes the Holy Spirit impregnating her. The bedroom setting is appropriate, since the triptych depicts the moment her marriage to God is consummated. The flowers behind her are traditional symbols for Mary: lilies for her purity and columbine for her sorrow.

The wings of the triptych contain an array of saints in verdant landscapes. The upper left panel has Jerome and Francis; lower left, Bernardino of Siena and Anthony Abbot; upper right, John the Baptist and Benedict; lower right, Michael and Christopher. When not in use, the wings would have been closed to conceal the brilliant interior, leaving visible only grisaille portraits of Paul and Bernard resembling statues.

== Acquisition ==
The IMA acquired this artwork one particularly hectic week in 1997, when they also purchased major works by Willy Finch and Richard Edward Miller. On December 3, associate curator of pre-1800 paintings and sculptures Ronda Kasl traveled to Sotheby's London branch to bid on the triptych. Relying on stealth, she stayed out of the bidding at first and allowed her competitors to dismiss her as a scholarly observer. She then blindsided them around the US$1 million mark, battling it out with a prominent New York art dealer before securing the artwork for $1.25 million. After this triumph, she rode the Tube back to her hotel. The acquisition was funded by the Lilly Endowment and Anonymous Art Fund. As part of the IMA's permanent collection, it has the accession number 1997.138.

== See also ==
- Annunciation Triptych (Lorenzo Monaco)
