= Portrait of Tommaso Portinari =

Painting by Hans Memling

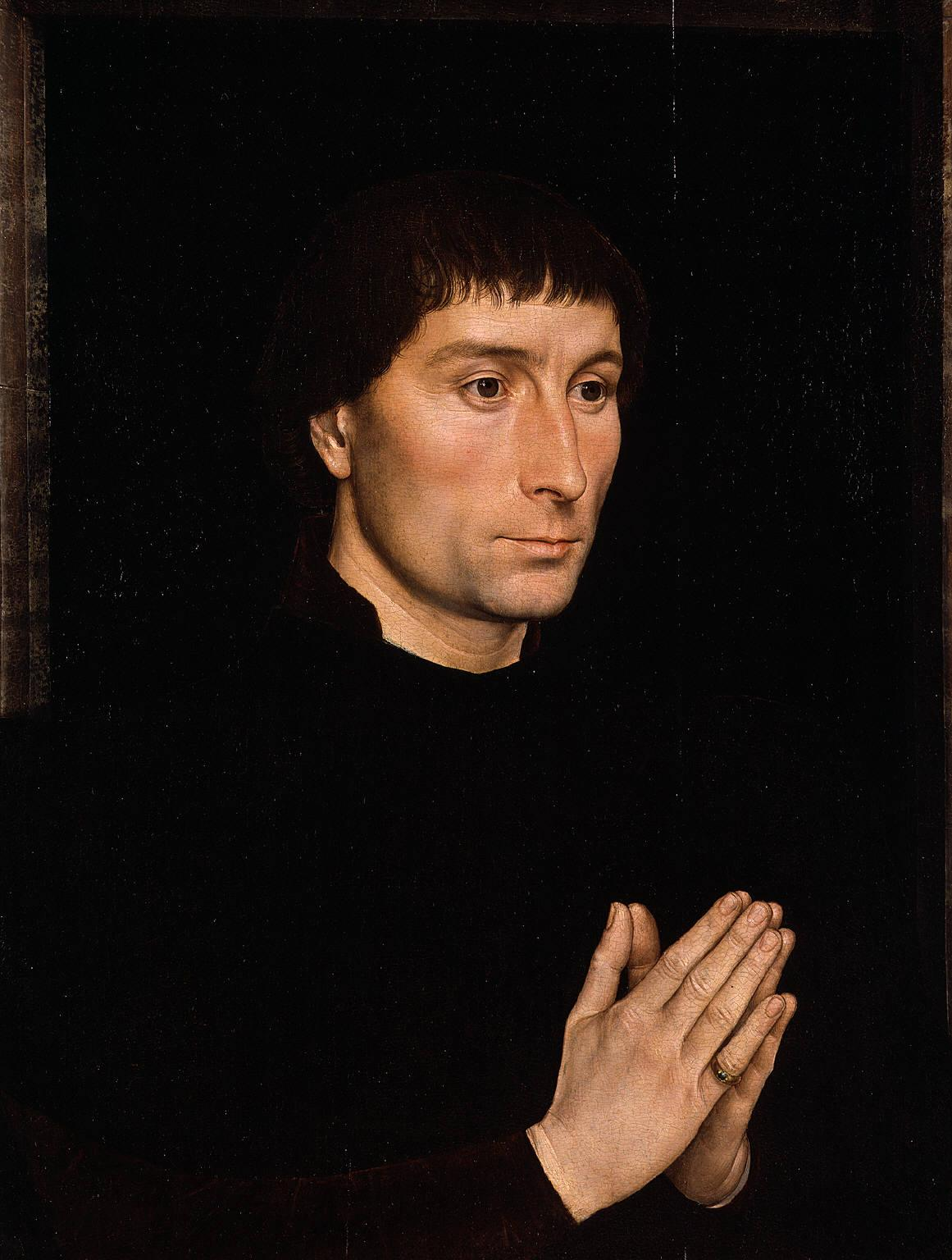
Hans Memling, Portrait of Tommaso Portinari, c.1470, Metropolitan Museum of Art

Portrait of Tommaso Portinari by Hans Memling is held by the Metropolitan Museum of Art, New York City. It was made c.1470 in oil on oak panel, and measures 44.1 by 33.7 centimetres (17.4 in × 13.3 in). The painting and Memling's Portrait of Maria Portinari form the wings from a since dismantled triptych; the central panel is believed to have been a now lost depiction of the Madonna and Child; perhaps Memling's Virgin and Child in the National Gallery, London.

== Background ==
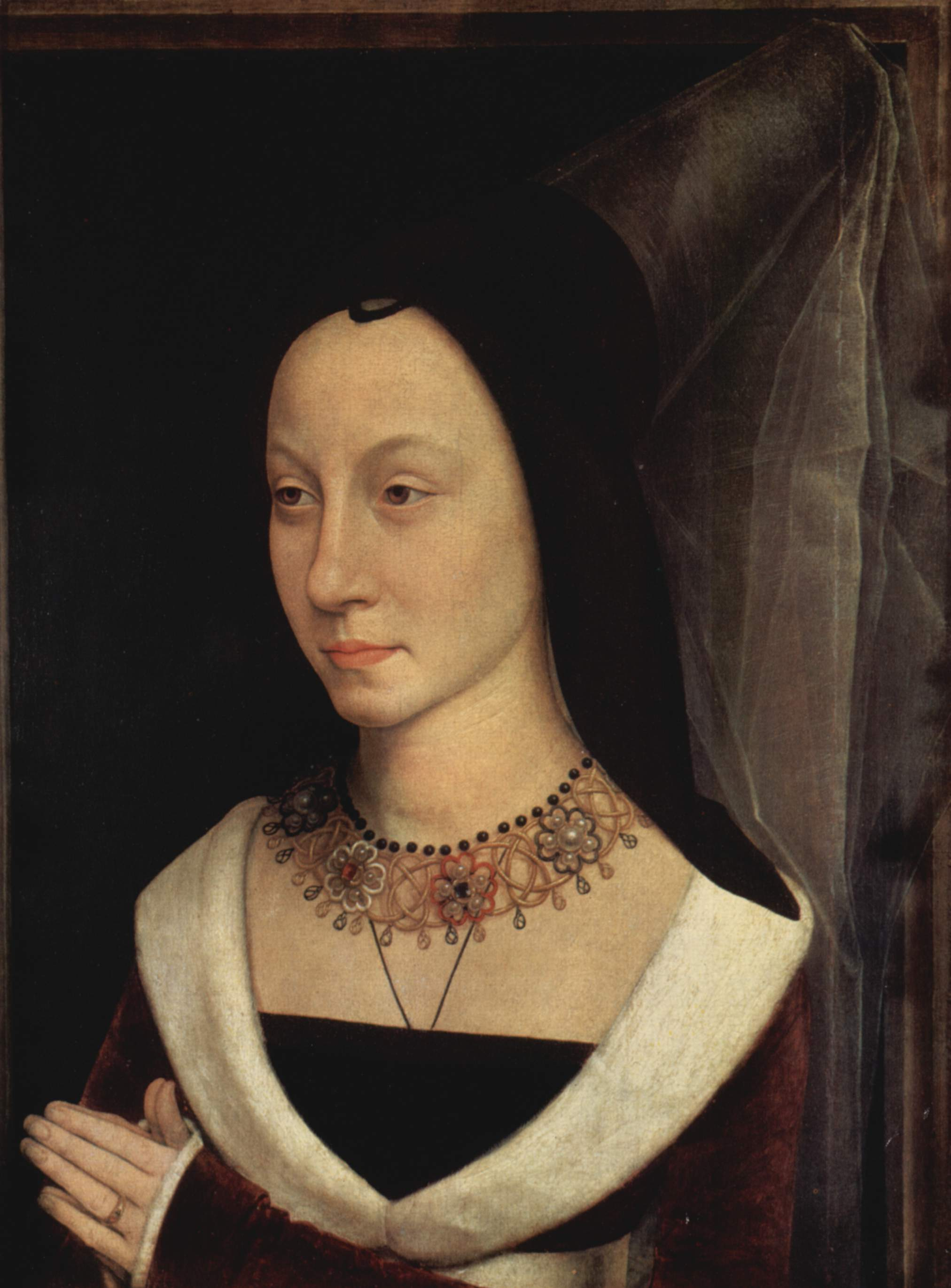
Portrait of Maria Portinari, c. 1470–72. Including frame: 44.1 cm × 34 cm (17.4 in × 13.4 in). Metropolitan Museum of Art, New York

Tommaso Portinari was a Florentine sent to Bruges c.1440 to work in the local branch of the Medici bank. He rose to become the manager of the branch c.1465. Portinari was a patron of Hugo van der Goes, who painted the Portinari Altarpiece, and also of Hans Memling. The triptych was probably commissioned in 1470 to celebrate Portinari's wedding to Maria, for their private religious devotions at their ostentatious home in Bruges at Bladelinhof.

Tommaso represented the Medici bank in Bruges, but after a promising early career made a number of risky, unsecured loans to Charles the Bold which eventually led to the branch's insolvency. The couple returned to Florence in 1497, but Tommaso died young.

== Description ==
The work is a three-quarter half-length portrait of Portinari, who is turned to his right, and set against a dark background. He wears a black cape, from which the collar and sleeves of a dark robe protrude, typical garments of the upper middle class of the time. His hands are clasped as if praying, with his elbows resting on a parapet at or just below the lower edge of the frame. Underdrawing shows that Memling changed the position of Tommaso's hands to make them less vertical.

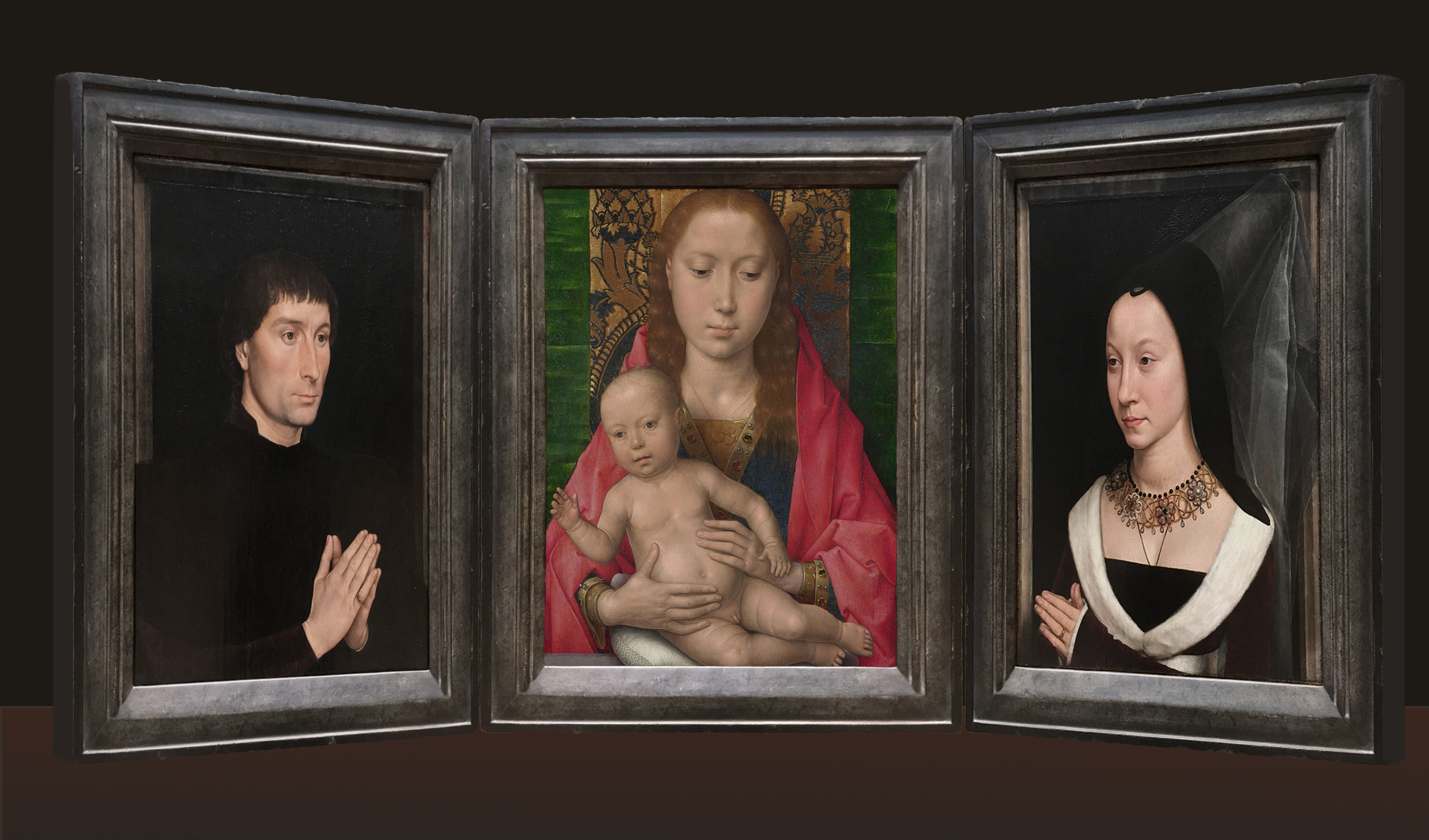
Speculative reconstruction of the triptych

Tommaso's son Francesco Portinari bequeathed the work to Hospital of Santa Maria Nuova in 1544, when it was described as "unum tabernaculettum que clauditur with tribus sportellis, in this est depicta imago Gloriossime virginis Marie et patris et matris dicti testatoris" ("a small tabernacle with three hinged panels, in which are painted the images of the most glorious Virgin Mary and of the testator's father and mother"). It remained at the hospital until the Napoleonic times, and was later in the Demidoff collection. It is not clear when the central panel was separated from its two wings.

The Tommaso and Maria Portinari panels were sold, with an attribution to Dieric Bouts, in 1870 for 6,000 francs. They were acquired in Rome c.1900 by Elia Volpi, then in 1901 passed through the hands of Thomas Agnew & Sons in London and to Léopold Goldschmidt in Paris. They were included in the important Primitifs flamands exhibition in Bruges in 1902. In 1910 the panels was sold by F. Kleinberger Galleries to Benjamin Altman for $426,500; he left them to the Metropolitan Museum of Art on his death in 1913.

== Sources ==
- Ainsworth, Maryan. Hans Memling as a Draughtsman, in Hans Memling: Essays (ed. Dirk De Vos). Ghent, 1994. ISBN 978-90-5544-030-6
- Nash, Susie. Northern Renaissance art. Oxford: Oxford University Press, 2008. ISBN 978-0-19-284269-5
- Panofsky, Erwin. Early Netherlandish Painting. London: HarperCollins, 1953. ISBN 978-0-06-430002-5
- Tommaso di Folco Portinari (1428–1501); Maria Portinari (Maria Maddalena Baroncelli, born 1456), Metropolitan Museum of Art
- Waldman, Louis Alexander. "New Documents for Memling's Portinari Portraits in the Metropolitan Museum of Art." Apollo, Number 153, February 2001
- Wehle, Harry. "Maria Portinari". The Metropolitan Museum of Art Bulletin, January 1953
