= Master of the Legend of Saint Ursula (Bruges) =

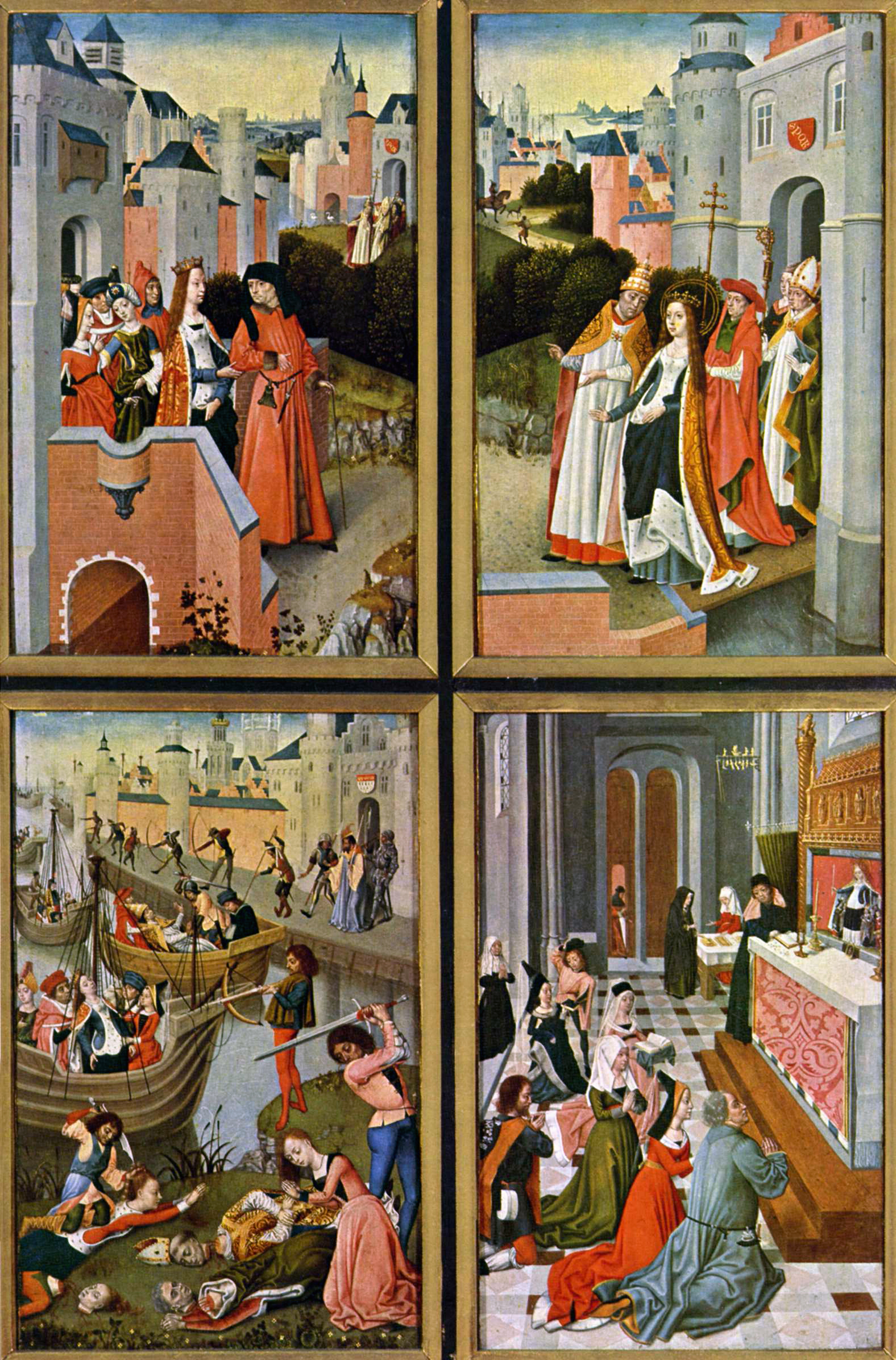
Altarpiece of the legend of St. Ursula, right side

The Master of the Legend of St. Ursula (1436–1505) was a Flemish painter active in the fifteenth century. His name is derived from a polyptych depicting scenes from the life of Saint Ursula painted for the convent of the Black Sisters of Bruges. The city appears in the background of a number of the paintings, in which the belfry and tower of the Church of Notre-Dame are visible. Consequently, it is possible, given the stages of construction of the belfry, to determine that the altarpiece was painted either before 1483 or somewhere between 1493 and 1499. The Netherlands Institute for Art History hold his birth and death dates to be those of Pieter Casenbroot, who was registered in the Bruges guild of saddlemakers and sculptors in 1460. Today the panels have been dispersed to a number of museums around the world.

A few other paintings have been attributed to the Master on the basis of style; these include a triptych of the Nativity in the Detroit Institute of Arts, a triptych of the Annunciation, and paintings in Brussels, Cherbourg, Middlebury, Toronto and Rochester. A Cologne artist is also known as Master of the legend of St. Ursula, for a painting also representing the life of Ursula.

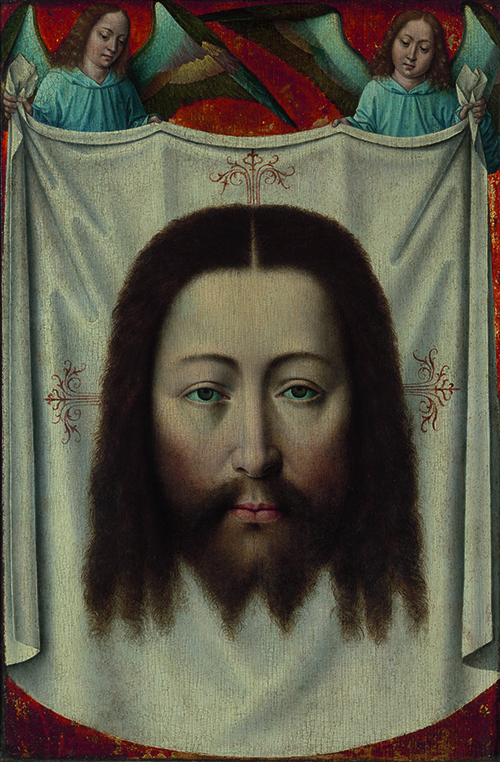
Vera icon with angels, The Phoebus Foundation
