= Dirk de Vos (art historian) =

Belgian art historian

Dirk de Vos was a Belgian art historian specialising in medieval art. He was the curator of the Groeningemuseum in Bruges.

== Work ==
De Vos's magnum opus is a catalogue of the complete works of Hans Memling, on whom he curated a major exhibition in 1994. He followed this in 1999 with a catalogue of the complete works of Rogier van der Weyden.

== Publications ==
- Stedelijke musea Brugge: catalogus schilderijen 15de en 16de eeuw. Stad Brugge, 1979.
- Groeningemuseum Brugge: de volledige verzameling. Die Keure, 1984.
- Catalogue: Hans Memling. Fonds Mercator Paribas, 1994 ISBN 90-5544-029-9
- (editor), Essays: Hans Memling. Stedelijke Musea, Bruges, 1994 ISBN 90-5544-030-2
- Hans Memling: The Complete Works. Thames & Hudson, 1994. ISBN 978-0500-2369-8-7
- Rogier van der Weyden: The Complete Works, translated by Ted Alkins. Harry N. Abrams, 1999. ISBN 081-0963-90-6
- The Flemish Primitives: The Masterpieces . Mercatorfonds and Princeton University Press, 2003. ISBN 978-0691-1166-1-7
