= Maryan Ainsworth =

American art historian

Maryan Ainsworth, who often publishes as Maryan Wynn Ainsworth, is an American art historian, author and curator specializing in 14th, 15th and 16th century Northern European painting, particularly in Early Netherlandish painting.

She received her B.A. and M.A. degrees at Oberlin College and her Ph.D. at Yale University. She spent her entire forty-year career at The Metropolitan Museum of Art, where since 2002 she served as the Curator of Early Netherlandish, French, and German Painting in the European Paintings Department, until her retirement in 2020. In this position, and previously as Senior Research Fellow in the Sherman Fairchild Paintings Conservation Department, she has specialized in an interdisciplinary approach to the investigation of Northern Renaissance paintings, uniting technical investigations with art historical inquiries.

== Career ==
She has published numerous articles and lectured widely on her work. Maryan is the editor of several books on art history methodology, and the principal author or chief collaborator on a number of exhibition catalogues, among them Petrus Christus Renaissance Master of Bruges (1994, Finalist Alfred H. Barr, Jr. Award); From Van Eyck to Bruegel, Early Netherlandish Painting in The Metropolitan Museum of Art (1998); Gerard David, Purity of Vision in an Age of Transition (1998, CINOA Prize and Apollo Books of the Year); Man, Myth, and Sensual Pleasures: Jan Gossart’s Renaissance, the Complete Works (2010, Alfred H. Barr Jr. Award), and with Elizabeth Cleland, Grand Design: Pieter Coecke van Aelst and Renaissance Tapestry (2014, AAMC Award for Excellence). German Paintings in The Metropolitan Museum of Art, 1350–1600, co-authored with Joshua Waterman, received the AAMC Award for Excellence (2013).

Ainsworth has trained twenty-five graduate art history students in technical art history through The Met’s Slifka Fellowship. In addition, she has served as Adjunct Professor of the History of Art at Barnard College and Columbia University, where since 1986 she has taught a course, taking place at The Met, on paintings connoisseurship and technical art history. In the fall of 2017, Ainsworth was the Robert Janson-La Palme Visiting Professor at Princeton University. In 2018-19, she served as the Kress-Beinecke Professor at the Center for Advanced Study in the Visual Arts (CASVA) at the National Gallery of Art in Washington, where she worked on a book on The Met’s Early Netherlandish paintings.

Maryan’s interdisciplinary studies in technical art history were acknowledged in 1994 with the College Art Association/National Institute for Conservation Joint Award for Distinction in Scholarship and Conservation. For her contributions to the culture and art history of Belgium, she was awarded the Knight of the Order of the Crown in 2001, and the Knight of the Order of Léopold, bestowed by King Albert II of Belgium, in 2011. A participant in many professional organizations, Ainsworth also serves on the board of directors of the Belgian-American Educational Foundation (since 1999), and the King Baudouin Foundation (since 2017). She is a member of the international advisory committees for the research and restoration of notable works by Hieronymus Bosch, Rogier van der Weyden, Bernard van Orley, Maarten van Heemskerck, and Jan and Hubert van Eyck’s Ghent Altarpiece.

Ainsworth retired from her position at the MET in 2020, but continues to operate as a curator emerita.

== Selected publications ==
- German Paintings in The Metropolitan Museum of Art, 1350—1600. Metropolitan Museum of Art, 2013
- Ainswort, Maryan W. (2010). Man, Myth, and Sensual Pleasures: Jan Gossart's Renaissance The Complete Works (1 ed.). New York: Metropolitan Museum of Art. ISBN 978-0300166576.
- Tapestry in the Renaissance: art and magnificence. Metropolitan Museum of Art, 2002
- Early Netherlandish painting at the crossroads: a critical look at current methodologies. Yale University Press, 2001
- Ainsworth, Maryan W. (2017). Workshop Practice in Early Netherlandish Painting: Case Studies from Van Eyck through Gossart. Me Fecit. Vol. 10. Brepols Publishers. ISBN 9782503566689.
