= Tommaso Portinari =

Italian banker

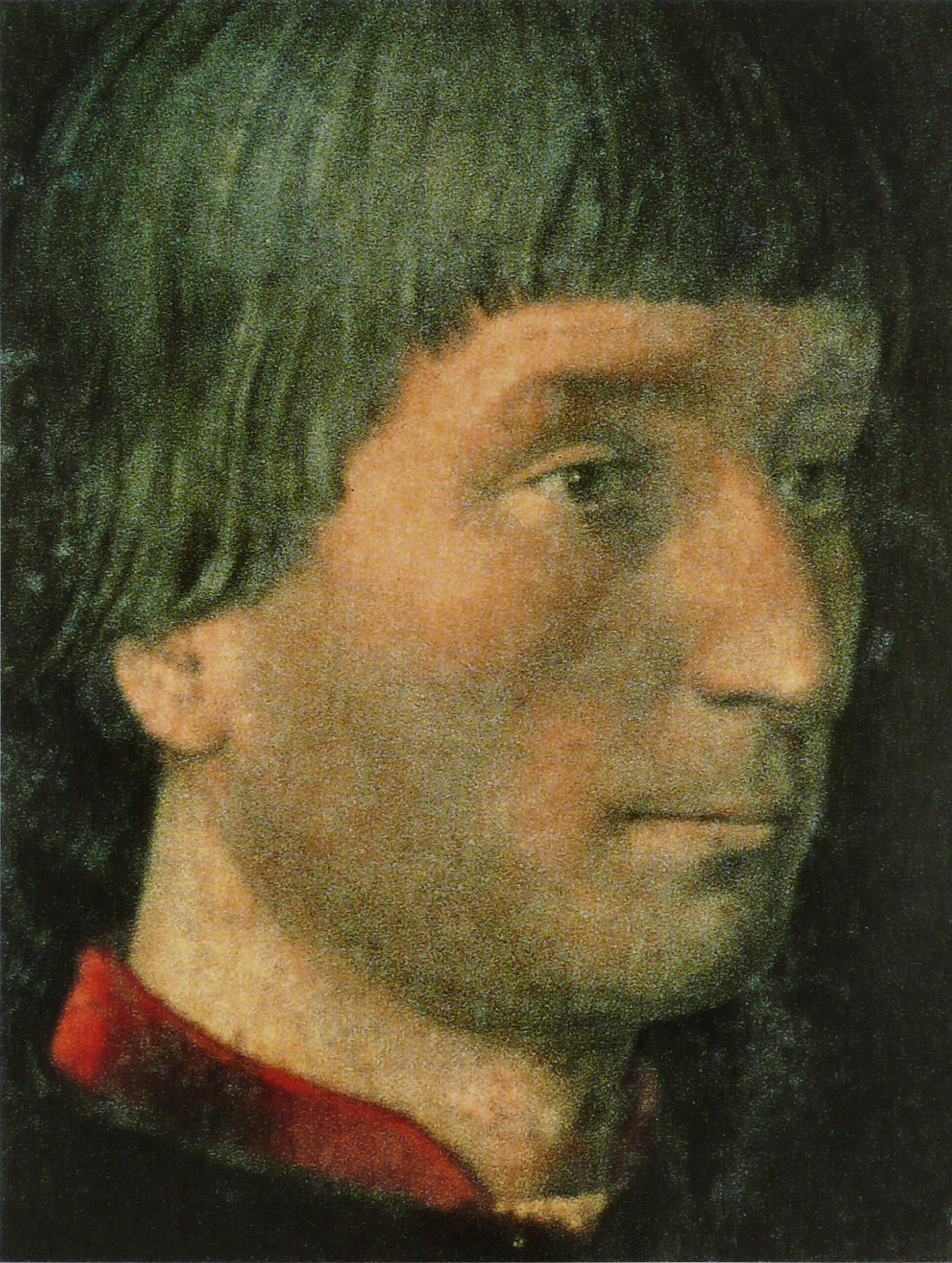
Tommaso Portinari, detail of Portinari Triptych by Hugo van der Goes

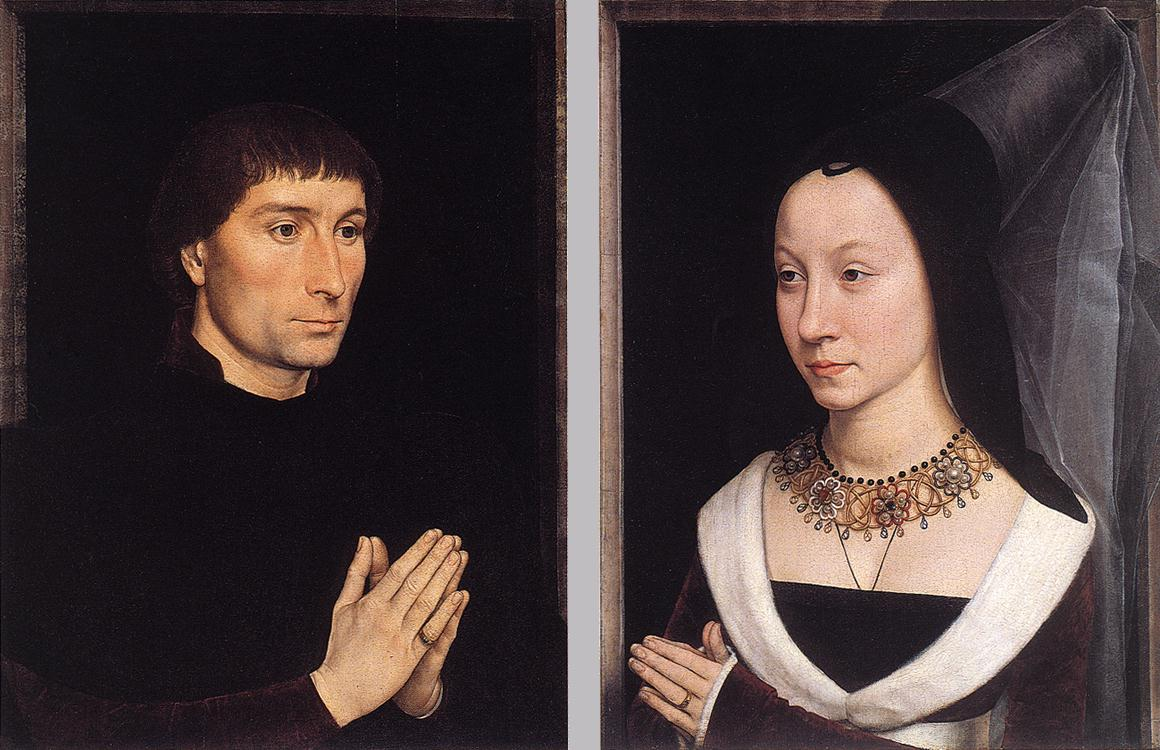
Hans Memling's c.1470 Portrait of Tommaso Portinari and Portrait of Maria Portinari

Tommaso Portinari (c.1424? – 1501) was an Italian banker for the Medici bank in Bruges. He was a member of a prominent Florentine family, coming from Portico di Romagna, near Forlì; that family had included Dante's muse, Beatrice Portinari. His father was a Medici branch manager, and after his death in 1421, Tommaso and his orphaned brothers were taken in and raised in the household of Cosimo de' Medici. Today he is mainly remembered for two significant commissions of Early Netherlandish paintings.

== Career ==
Portinari was an employee in the Bruges branch for a very long time, more than 25 years, but never rose higher than assistant manager and factor, apparently at the insistence of Cosimo de' Medici, who did not trust him. After Cosimo's death, he became general manager and shareholder in the branch at the age of 40, aided by the influence of his brothers, longtime managers of the bank's Milan branch. When Francesco Sassetti's influence removed the long-standing ban on lending to secular officials in 1471, Portinari used his position to make very large and extremely risky unsecured loans to Charles the Bold—loans which were never repaid and cost the bank heavily. He initially loaned 6,000 groat, more than twice that branch's total capital; the loan only grew worse, until it stood at 9500 groat in 1478. Unsurprisingly, for his good services, Portinari became a favored councilor to Charles the Bold. On the latter's death in battle, the loan went essentially into default. Further good money was thrown after bad when he lent to Archduke Maximilian of Austria, Charles's successor. A small portion of this loan was eventually repaid.

He was the defendant in Ruffini v. Portinari in 1455, one of the first legal cases to deal with separation of partnerships and legal liability: he was sued by the Milanese Damiano Ruffini for "defective packing of nine bales of wool bought by the plaintiff from the Medici branch in London. The defendant pointed out that the bales never belonged to the Bruges branch and that the plaintiff should sue the London branch." Portinari testified that the two branches were legally and commercially separate, apparently persuading the judge who denied Ruffini's suit, but upholding his right to sue the manager of the London branch.

== Portraits ==
Portinari Altarpiece
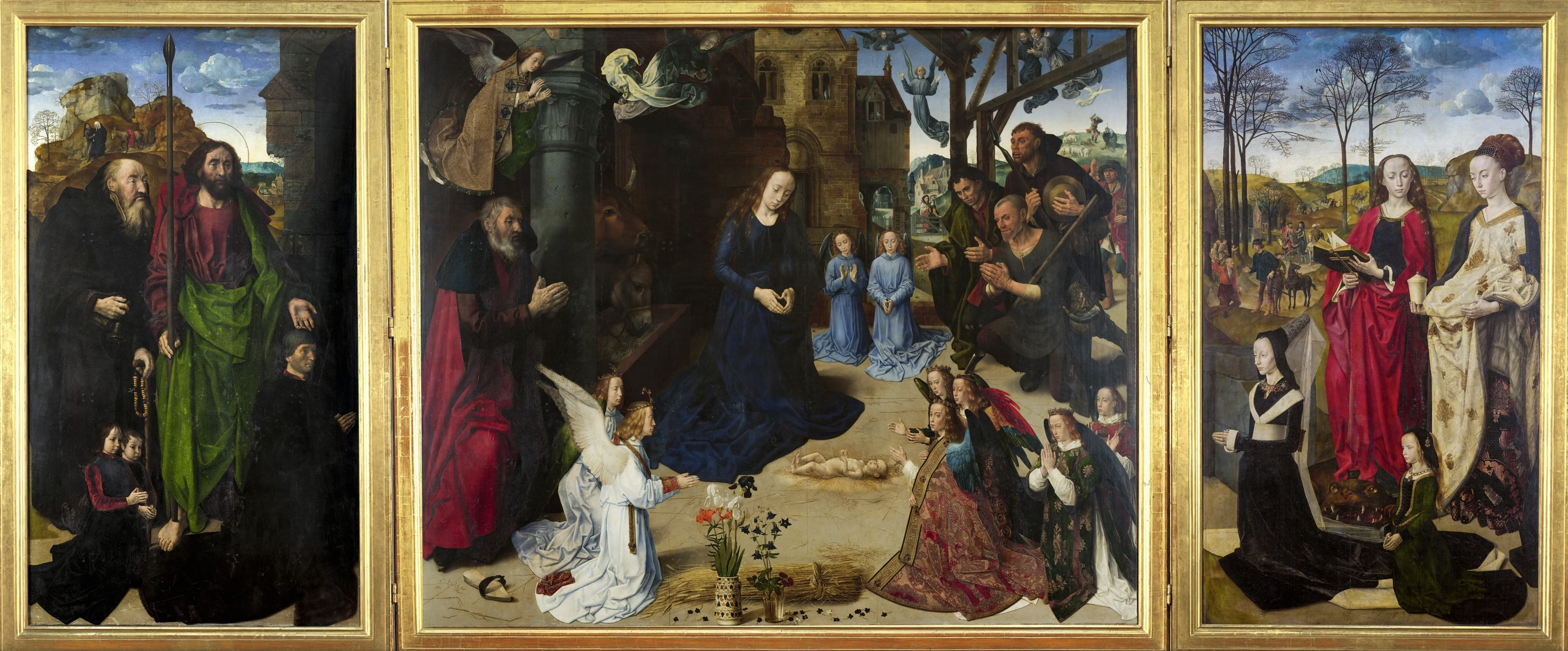
- Artist: Hugo van der Goes
- Year: 1475–1476
- Medium: Oil on wood
- Location: Uffizi Gallery, Florence

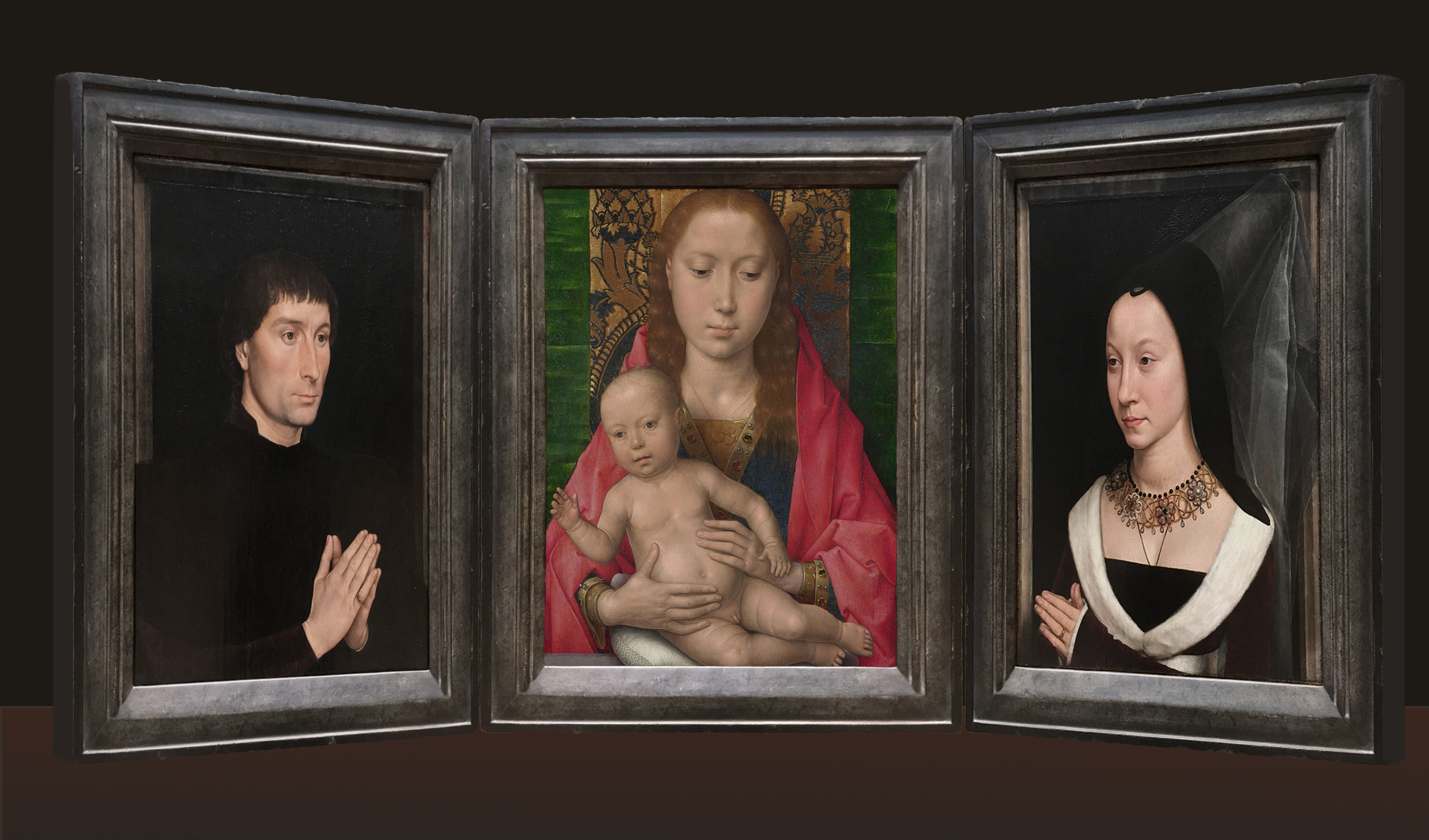
Speculative reconstruction of the 1470 Portinari triptych

While at the height of his career, he had himself memorialized in religious paintings. One, the Portinari Triptych, is visible today in Florence. In commissioning it, he ostentatiously compared himself with his predecessor at the Bruges branch, Angelo Tani. He may also have commissioned The Last Judgment, by Hans Memling, as it has been suggested that the soul of the sinner being weighed on the scales of St. Michael is in fact a donor portrait of Portinari. This painting, also intended for a Florentine church, was hijacked by pirates from the Baltic Sea, leading incidentally to a lengthy lawsuit against the Hanseatic League to force them to return it. He and his wife are portrayed in donor portraits in Hans Memling's c.1470 painting Scenes from the Passion of Christ, now held by the Galleria Sabauda in Turin, and Memling also painted their portraits for a triptych c.1470: Portrait of Tommaso Portinari, Portrait of Maria Portinari.

Financial problems with the sale of alum from the joint Papal-Medici alum cartel and bad investments like two galleys that either sank or were captured by privateers, along with the still outstanding bad loans to Charles the Bold, caused the Medici to finally give up on Bruges in 1478, when they unilaterally dissolved the partnership. Portinari was essentially fired and he fell on hard times. He eventually made a comeback of sorts as a diplomat (involved in, among other things, the Intercursus Magnus). Ironically, the most useful part of his being a diplomat was being able to return home to Florence without being thrown into debtor's prison. His attempts to start his own bank failed, his past services to the Medici and the Duchy of Burgundy were forgotten, and he died a pauper in the Hospital of Santa Maria Nuova, which his ancestor Folco Portinari had founded in 1288. His estate was so meager and his business dealings so dubious that his inheriting son refused to inherit the estate, so as to avoid any possible overdue debts.

== In popular culture ==
- He is a secondary character in Niccolò Rising, by Dorothy Dunnett, where he is one of a number of bankers' assistants in Bruges in 1459. An ostrich intended as a ducal gift eats the rings off his fingers.
