= Exposition des primitifs flamands à Bruges =

Art exhibition of Early Netherlandish Painting in 1902

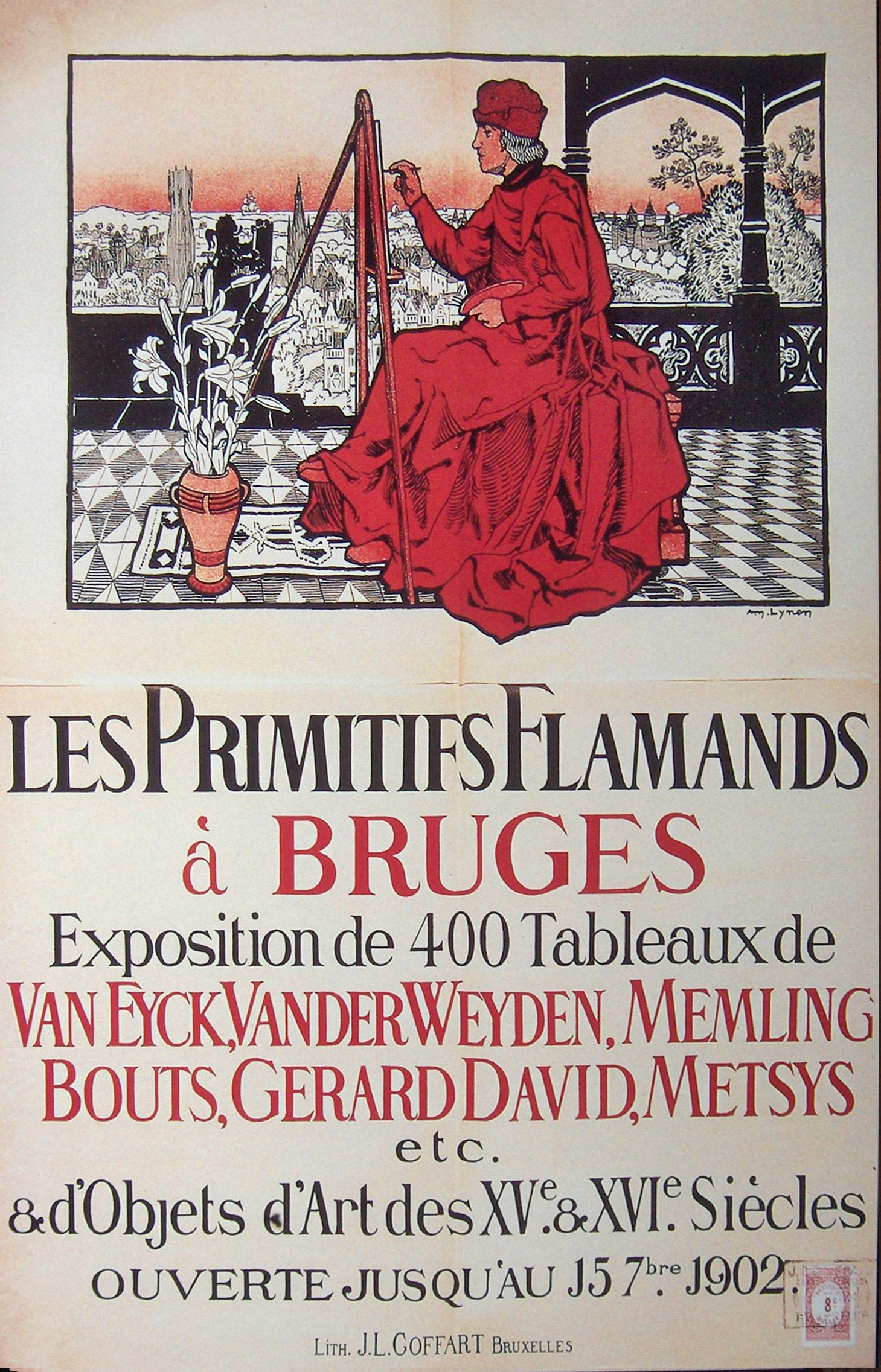
Official poster of the exhibition, designed by Amédée Lynen

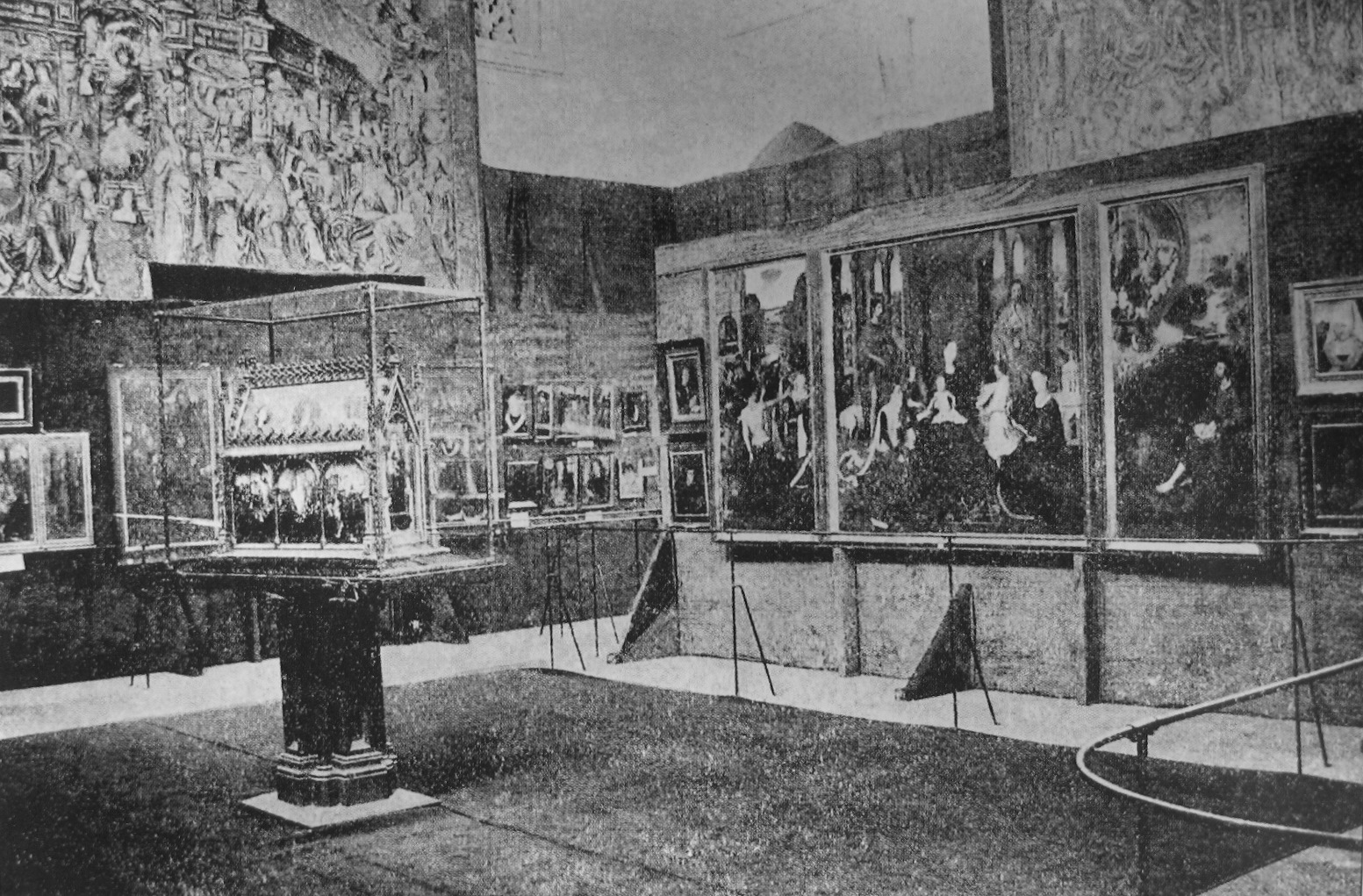
View of the main Memling room at the exhibition, with the St. Ursula Shrine at the centre, from Johan Huizinga's The Autumn of the Middle Ages

The Exposition des primitifs flamands à Bruges (Exhibition of Flemish Primitives at Bruges) was an art exhibition of paintings by the so-called Flemish Primitives (nowadays usually called Early Netherlandish painters) held in the Provinciaal Hof in Bruges between 15 June and 5 October 1902.

It was the largest exhibition of 15th- and 16th-century Flemish art to date, consisted of 413 official catalogue entries, and drew some 35,000 visitors. The exposition was highly influential, leading to at least five contemporary books as well as numerous scholarly articles, and initiated deeper study of the Flemish Primitives by a new generation of connoisseurs. It also inspired Johan Huizinga to research and write his The Autumn of the Middle Ages. The change in attribution of many important works (in table below) reflects progress in understanding the era by art historians since then, although it is an ongoing process.

== Exposition ==
The 1902 exhibition was not the first to focus on the Flemish Primitives, although it was the first on this scale and to generate so much interest and scientific feedback. Among earlier exhibitions were the 1867 "Tableaux de l'ancienne école Néerlandaise" in Bruges, also directed by W. H. J. Weale; the 1892 "Exhibition of pictures by masters of the Netherlandish and allied schools of XV and early XVI centuries" at the Burlington Fine Arts Club, with 60 pictures; and the 1899 Netherlandish School exhibition at the New Gallery (London), with 165 works.

The 1902 exposition was originally intended for Brussels, but moved to Bruges after the city refused to lend them many works it held to the exhibition if it did not take place in Bruges. It was held in the Provincial Government Palace in Bruges from 15 June until 15 September 1902, but due to popular demand was extended until 5 October 1902.

The president of the exhibition was Baron Henri Kervyn de Lettenhove.

William Henry James Weale wrote the notes for the catalogue for the painting section. The often erroneous attributions were those of the owners, but the position of the paintings in the exhibition generally reflected the opinion of the organizers, including Weale and Georges Hulin de Loo (a professor at the University of Ghent), regarding their authorship. The illustrated catalogue of the section showing manuscripts, miniatures, archive texts, seals, mereaux, coins and medals was written by Baron Albert Van Zuylen Van Nyevelt. A third section, covering needlework, gobelins, and the like, was catalogued by Isabelle Errera.

The exhibition showed some 400 paintings attributed to the Flemish Primitives, many of which had never before been exhibited. The display of many works by major artists created the first strong opportunity to compare their styles side by side and revise earlier attributions, either from one painter to another or from "work by" to "copy of a work by".

The exhibition was opened by King Leopold II of Belgium, and visited by Crown Prince Albert and Crown Princess Elisabeth on 3 July 1902.

== Legacy ==
The exhibition showed far more of the most important remaining examples of Early Netherlandish panel painting than earlier exhibitions and sparked a lively discussion about the attributions of the paintings, started by Hulin de Loo: dissatisfied with the official catalogue, he published his own critical catalogue.

The exhibition greatly improved the appreciation of Early Netherlandish art, which previously had been chiefly appreciated only by a few collectors and art historians, but also led to shifts in the status of the artists: Hans Memling, who had been considered to be the major artist of the period, was surpassed by the likes of Jan van Eyck and Rogier van der Weyden. This has been attributed to the abundance of works by Memling at the exhibition, which made critics notice the lack of invention and overly serialized production he often showed, compared to the other masters.

Because the organizers of the exhibition had a somewhat Belgian nationalistic view, art lovers in other countries sometimes reacted vehemently to the appropriation of "their" painters by the Flemish or Belgians. In France, there were calls for a similar exhibition of French Primitives, which was organised in 1904 and tried to reclaim artists, like van der Weyden and Robert Campin, who were from French-speaking parts of the Netherlands; it also tried to cast Early Netherlandish painting as a derivative of Early French painting.

The Bruges exhibition directly influenced some painters, who incorporated aspects of Flemish Primitive painting into their work. Flemish expressionist Gustave Van de Woestijne changed his approach to portraiture, focusing more on the psychological aspects, while his colleague Valerius de Saedeleer was influenced by the landscapes he saw at the exhibition.

In 2002, a new exhibition documenting the 1902 exhibition and its impact was held in Bruges: "Impact 1902 Revisited. Early Flemish and Ancient Art exhibition. Bruges 15th June - 15th September 1902, Brugge, 2002.", with a catalogue by Eva Tahon, Piet Boyens e.a.

=== Publications ===
Apart from the official catalogue, a number of books and major articles were written about the exhibition, including:

- (Anonymous), The Exhibition of Flemish Art at Bruges, in Athenaeum 3907 and 3908, 1902 (probably by Roger Fry)
- (Anonymous (L.M.)), L'exposition des primitifs flamands à Bruges, in La chronique des arts et de la curiosité 15, 1902
- Giorgio Le Brun, L'esposizione dei primitivi fiamminghi, Rassegna d'Arte 2 (1902)
- Pol de Mont, Een paar opmerkingen betr. de Tentoonstelling van oude Nederlandsche schilderijen te Brugge, in de Nederlandsche Spectator, 1902
- Pol de Mont, L'Evolution de la peinture néerlandaise aux XIVe, XVe et XVIe siècles et l'exposition de Bruges. Book, Haarlem, 1903
- Pol de Mont, De paneelschildering in de Nederlanden gedurende de XIVe, XVe en de eerste helft van de XVIe eeuw naar aanleiding van de in 1902 te Brugge gehouden tentoonstelling, gezeid "Van Vlaamse priemietieven", Haarlem 1903
- Franz Dülberg, Die Ausstellung altniederländischer Malerei in Brügge., in Zeitschrift für bildende Kunst 14 (1903)
- Émile Durand-Greville, Originaux et Copies à propos de l'exposition de Bruges, Bruges 1902
- Hippolyte Fierens-Gevaert, L'exposition des Primitifs Flamands à Bruges, in Revue de l'art ancien et moderne XII, 1902
- Henri Frantz, L'exposition des primitifs flamands à Bruges, in Les Arts 7, 1902
- Max Jakob Friedländer, Die Brügger Leihausstellung von 1902, in Repertorium für Kunstwissenschaft 26 (1903)
- Max Jakob Friedländer, Meisterwerke der niederländischen Malerei des XV. und XVI. Jahrhunderts auf der Ausstellung zu Brügge 1902. Book, Munich, 1903
- Jules Guiffrey, L'exposition des Primitifs Flamands à Bruges, multiple articles in "L'Art" in 1902 and 1903
- Georges Hulin de Loo, Exposition de tableaux flamands des XIVe, XVe et XVIe siècles: catalogue critique précédé d'une introduction sur l'identité de certains maîtres anonymes. Book, Ghent, 1902.
- Henri Hymans, L'Exposition des primitifs flamands à Bruges. Gazette des Beaux-Arts 28 (1902); then republished as a book, Paris, 1902
- Georges Lafenestre, Les Vieux Maîtres à Bruges, in Revue des Deux Mondes, 1902
- Georges Lafenestre, Les primitifs à Bruges et à Paris, 1900, 1902, 1904: Vieux Maîtres de France et des Pays-Bas Book
- Wilhelm Martin, De Vlaamsche primitieven op de tentoonstelling te Brugge, special issue of Elsevier's Magazine, 1903
- Octave Maus, The Exhibition of Early Flemish Pictures at Bruges, in The Magazine of Art, 1903
- Alphonse Naert, Tentoonstelling van oude Vlaamsche kunst, te Brugge, in Dietsche Warande en Belfort, 1902
- Claude Phillips, Impressions of the Bruges Exhibition, in The Fortnightly Review, 1902
- Eugène-Justin Soil de Moriamé, L'école de Tournai, in Annales de la Société Historique et Archéologique de Tournai, 1902
- Hugo von Tschudi, Ausstellung Altniederländische Malerei in Brügge, Juni-Sept. 1902, in Repertorium für Kunstwissenschaft, 1902
- Octave Uzanne, The Exhibition of Primitive Art at Bruges, in The Connoisseur, 1902
- Karel van de Woestijne, De Vlaamsche Primitieven, hoe ze waren te Brugge, in Onze Kunst, 1902
- Medard Verkest, Tentoonstelling van Vlaamsche Primitieven en Oude Meesters te Brugge, Tongeren, 1902
- William Henry James Weale, The Early Painters of the Netherlands as Illustrated by the Bruges Exhibition of 1902., in the first issue of The Burlington Magazine (1903)

== Exhibited works ==
The works are listed according to their current attributions; where known, the attributions as given by the official catalogue and the critical catalogue by Hulin de Loo are given as well.

Image	Title	Cat. nr.	1902 / Hulin attribution	Painter	Date	Current or last known location	Notes
	Virgin with child, St. George, Ste. Catherine, the donors and their children	1	Unknown / Unknown, Flemish, c. 1420	Unknown	1420	Museum Godshuis Belle	
	Four-lobed triptych displaying the Holy Trinity and the Evangelists	2	Melchior Broederlam / Unknown, Flemish or Franco-Flemish, end of the 14th century	Unknown	1390	Gemäldegalerie	
	Statue of the Virgin with Child, in a polychrome tabernacle with painted wings depicting episodes in the life of Mary	3	Melchior Broederlam(school of) /	Melchior Broederlam	1412s 1390s	Louvre	
	Crucifixion with Saints Catherine and Barbara	4	Primitive school, c. 1400 / Unknown, Bruges, c. 1400	Unknown	1400	St. Salvator's Cathedral	
	Virgin and child, with Sts. Peter, Paul, Mary Magdalen, and the donor, the so-called Virgin with the butterfly	5	Unknown (Liège, 1459) /	Unknown	1459	Liège Cathedral	
	Crucifixion, with angels carrying the instruments of Passion, the Virgin, and the donor	6	Unknown /	Unknown	1420s	St. Salvator's Cathedral	
	The Three Marys at the grave	7	Hubert van Eyck / Hubert van Eyck	Jan van Eyck; Hubert van Eyck	1420s 1430s	Museum Boijmans Van Beuningen	
	St. Romold invested as bishop of Dublin	8	Jan van Eyck / Unknown, Bruges, end of the 15th century	Master of the Youth of Saint Romold	1490	National Gallery of Ireland	
	Adam and Eve (Wings of the Ghent Altarpiece)	9	Jan van Eyck / Jan van Eyck	Jan van Eyck; Hubert van Eyck	1426	Saint Bavo Cathedral	
	Virgin and Child with Canon van der Paele	10	Jan van Eyck / Jan van Eyck	Jan van Eyck	1434; 1436	Groeningemuseum	
	Virgin and Child	11	Jan van Eyck / Jan van Eyck, later copy after	Unknown	1437	1902: collection of the Earl of Northbrook; current location unknown	
	Saint Barbara	11.1	Jan van Eyck / Jan van Eyck	Jan van Eyck	1437	Royal Museum of Fine Arts Antwerp (KMSKA)	
	Portrait of Margaret van Eyck	12	Jan van Eyck / Jan van Eyck	Jan van Eyck	1439	Groeningemuseum	
	Madonna at the Fountain	13	Jan van Eyck / Jan van Eyck	Jan van Eyck	1439	Royal Museum of Fine Arts Antwerp (KMSKA)	
	Virgin and Child with donor Pieter Wijts	14	Jan van Eyck / Jan van Eyck, possible, but heavily overpainted	Unknown	1630s	Groeningemuseum	
	Portrait of a Man with a Blue Chaperon	15	Jan van Eyck / Jan van Eyck	Jan van Eyck	1435s	Brukenthal National Museum	
	Portrait of an old man	16	Jan van Eyck / Hans Memling, possibly	Hans Memling	1475	Metropolitan Museum of Art	
	A Goldsmith in His Shop, Possibly Saint Eligius	17	Petrus Christus / Petrus Christus	Petrus Christus	1449	Metropolitan Museum of Art	
	Portrait of a man	18	Petrus Christus / Petrus Christus	Petrus Christus	1450s	National Gallery	
	Calvary	19	Petrus Christus / Petrus Christus	Petrus Christus		Georgium	
	Deposition of Christ	20	Petrus Christus / Petrus Christus	Petrus Christus	1455	Royal Museums of Fine Arts of Belgium	
	Virgin and Child	21	Unknown / Quentin Matsys	Quentin Matsys	1470s	Royal Museums of Fine Arts of Belgium	
	Triptych: Descent of the cross	22	Master of Flémalle / Master of Flémalle, copy after	Robert Campin	1450s	Walker Art Gallery	
	Virgin and Child before a Firescreen	23	Master of Flémalle / Master of Flémalle	Unknown	1425; 1430	National Gallery	
	The Virgin preparing the bath of the Child	24	Master of Flémalle / Unknown, Flemish, c. 1500, after the Master of Flémalle	Jan Gossaert	1500	Bob Jones University museum and gallery	
	Pietà	25	Rogier van der Weyden / Rogier van der Weyden	Rogier van der Weyden	1441	Royal Museums of Fine Arts of Belgium	
	Portrait of a man	26	Rogier van der Weyden / Rogier van der Weyden	Rogier van der Weyden	1455	Thyssen-Bornemisza Museum	
	Portrait of an unknown man	27	Rogier van der Weyden / Rogier van der Weyden?	Unknown	1450	private collection	
	Virgin and Child	28	Rogier van der Weyden / Rogier van der Weyden	Rogier van der Weyden	1460	Art Institute of Chicago	
	Scenes of the Life of Saint Joseph (right wing of a polyptych)	29	Rogier van der Weyden / Rogier van der Weyden, school of	Unknown	1465	Cathedral of Our Lady	
	Virgin and Child Enthroned	30	Rogier van der Weyden / Rogier van der Weyden	Rogier van der Weyden	1430s	Thyssen-Bornemisza Museum	
	Diptych: Calvary and Virgin with Child, Saint Philip and the donor	31	Unknown / Unknown, Brabant	Unknown	c. 1500	1902: Colnaghi, London; current location unknown	
	Pietà with Donor	32	Antonello da Messina / Unknown, Southern France	Unknown	1450s	Frick Collection	
	Portrait of Fearless John, Duke of Burgundy	33	Unknown / Unknown, old copy	Unknown	1450s	private collection	
	John the Baptist in the Wilderness	34	Geertgen tot Sint Jans / Geertgen tot Sint Jans	Geertgen tot Sint Jans	1490	Gemäldegalerie	
	Triptych: Martyrdom of Saint Erasmus	35	Dieric Bouts / Dieric Bouts	Dieric Bouts	1458	St. Peter's Church	
	The Last Supper	36	Dieric Bouts / Dieric Bouts	Dieric Bouts	1464	St. Peter's Church; M - Museum Leuven	
	Triptych: Martyrdom of Saint Hippolyte, Scene from the life of Saint Hippolyte, and The donors	37	Dieric Bouts / Dieric Bouts	Dieric Bouts; Hugo van der Goes	1468	St. Salvator's Cathedral	
	Portrait of a man	38	Dieric Bouts / Dieric Bouts	Dieric Bouts	1470	Metropolitan Museum of Art	
	Christ in the house of Simon	39	Dieric Bouts / Dieric Bouts	Dieric Bouts	1440s 1460	Berlin State Museums; Gemäldegalerie	
	Crucifixion, with Virgin and Saint John	40	Dieric Bouts /	Unknown	1465	Gemäldegalerie	
	Wings of a triptych: The Burning Bush and Gedeon's fleece	41	Dieric Bouts / Aelbrecht Bouts	Aelbrecht Bouts	1490	McNay Art Museum	
	Triptych: Last Supper, The Angel Pascal, Elias	42	Unknown / Unknown, Bruges, c. 1470–1485	Master of the Legend of Saint Catherine	1480	Bruges seminary	
	Virgin and Child	43	Dieric Bouts / Dieric Bouts, attributed?	Master of the Tiburtine Sibyl	1468	private collection	
	The Night of Christmas (fragment)	44	Dieric Bouts / Dieric Bouts	Dieric Bouts	1480s	Louvre	
	Legend of Saint Barbara, left wing of a triptych	45	Unknown / Unknown, Flanders (Ghent?), c. 1480	Master of the legend of St. Barbara	1480	Basilica of the Holy Blood	
	Wings of a triptych: The Church and the Synagogue (Ecclesia and Synagoga)	46	Unknown / Unknown, Bruges, 1460–1475	Master of the (Bruges) Legend of St. Ursula	1482	Groeningemuseum	
	Wings of an altarpiece: Scenes from the Legend of Saint Ursula	47	Unknown / Unknown, Bruges, 1460–1475; same painter as 46	Master of the (Bruges) Legend of St. Ursula	1482	Groeningemuseum	
	Virgin and Child, with a donor protected by Mary Magdalen	48	Unknown, c. 1460 / Unknown, c. 1470–1480	Master of the View of Ste-Gudule	1475	Curtius Museum	
	Triptych: Virgin and Child, Donor Jean de Witte, Donor Marie Hoose	49	Hans Memling(school of) /	Bruges Master of 1473	1473	Royal Museums of Fine Arts of Belgium	
	Scenes from the Life of Saint Lucy	50	Unknown /	Master of the Legend of Saint Lucy	1480	St. James Church	
	Death of the Virgin	51	Hugo van der Goes / Hugo van der Goes	Hugo van der Goes	1472; 1475	Groeningemuseum	
	Triptych: Adoration, The two other Kings, and Donor protected by Saint Stephen	52	Hugo van der Goes / Hugo van der Goes	Unknown	1500s	private collection	
	Descent of the Holy Ghost	53	Unknown / Unknown, Bruges, c. 1490	Master of the Baroncelli Portraits	1490	private collection	
	Virgin and Child	54	Hugo van der Goes / Dieric Bouts, circle of	Unknown	1460s	private collection	
	Portrait of a Man with a Roman Medal	55	Hans Memling / Hans Memling	Hans Memling	1470s	Royal Museum of Fine Arts Antwerp (KMSKA)	
	Triptych: Virgin, Donors, and Saints (the Donne Triptych)	56	Hans Memling / Hans Memling	Hans Memling	1478s	National Gallery	
	Portrait of Thomas Portinari	57	Hans Memling / Hans Memling	Hans Memling	1470	Metropolitan Museum of Art	
	Portrait of Maria Portinari	58	Hans Memling / Hans Memling	Hans Memling	1470	Metropolitan Museum of Art	
	Triptych: Virgin and Child seated in an open gallery, Saint John the Baptist, and John the Evangelist on Patmos (also known as the Saint John Altarpiece, or as the Mystical Marriage of Saint Catherine)	59	Hans Memling / Hans Memling	Hans Memling	1479	Old St. John's Hospital	
	Triptych: Adoration, Virgin looking at the Child on the ground, and John the Baptist and the woman receiving the image of the Holy face (the so-called Triptych of Jan Floreins)	60	Hans Memling / Hans Memling	Hans Memling	1479	Old St. John's Hospital	
	Triptych: Burial of Christ, Brother Adrien Reyns, protected by Saint Adrian, and Saint Barbara (the so-called Triptych of Adriaan Reins)	61	Hans Memling / Hans Memling	Hans Memling	1480	Old St. John's Hospital	
	Sibylla Sambetha	62	Hans Memling / Hans Memling	Hans Memling	1480	Old St. John's Hospital	
	Mystic Marriage of St. Catherine	63	Hans Memling / Hans Memling	Hans Memling	1479	Metropolitan Museum of Art	
	Portrait of Guillaume Moreel	64	Hans Memling / Hans Memling	Hans Memling	1480	Royal Museums of Fine Arts of Belgium	diptych with #65
	Portrait of Barbara van Vlaendenbergh	65	Hans Memling / Hans Memling	Hans Memling	1480	Royal Museums of Fine Arts of Belgium	diptych with #64
	Triptych: Saints Christoph, Maur and Gilles, The donor Guillaume Moreel with his five sons, protected by Saint Guillaume of Maleval, and The donor's wife Barbara van Vlaenderberch with their eleven daughters, protected by Saint Barbara (the so-called Moreel triptych)	66	Hans Memling / Hans Memling	Hans Memling	1484	Groeningemuseum	
	Diptych of Maarten van Nieuwenhove	67	Hans Memling / Hans Memling	Hans Memling	1487	Old St. John's Hospital	
	St. Ursula Shrine	68	Hans Memling / Hans Memling	Hans Memling	1489	Old St. John's Hospital	
	Supplice of Saint Sebastian	69	Hans Memling / Hans Memling	Hans Memling	1470s	Royal Museums of Fine Arts of Belgium	
	Portrait of a man with an arrow	70	Hans Memling / Hans Memling	Hans Memling	1478	National Gallery of Art, Washington	
	Right wing of a diptych: Portrait of a lady, part of Diptych of an elderly couple	71	Hans Memling / Hans Memling	Hans Memling	1470	Louvre	
	Virgin and Child	72	Hans Memling / Hans Memling	Hans Memling	1490	National Museum of Art of Romania	
	Right wing of a diptych: Portrait of a man from the Lespinette family	73	Hans Memling / Hans Memling	Hans Memling	1480s	Mauritshuis	
	Right wing of a polyptych: The donor and his son	74	Hans Memling / Hans Memling	Hans Memling	1490	National Museum of Art of Romania; Brukenthal National Museum	
	Left wing of a polyptych: The donor's wife	75	Hans Memling / Hans Memling	Hans Memling	1490	National Museum of Art of Romania; Brukenthal National Museum	
	The Jews demanding the condemnation of Christ	76	Hans Memling / Hans Memling	Unknown	1485	private collection	
	Portrait of a young man at prayer	77	Hans Memling / Hans Memling	Hans Memling	1475	National Gallery	
	Virgin and Child with an angel	78	Hans Memling / Hans Memling	Hans Memling	1485	Gemäldegalerie	
	Virgin and Child with two angels	79	Hans Memling / Hans Memling	Hans Memling	1479	National Gallery of Art, Washington	
	Nativity	80	Hans Memling / Hans Memling	Hans Memling	1470	Museum für Angewandte Kunst	
	Virgin and Child with Saint Anthony and the donor	81	Hans Memling / Hans Memling	Hans Memling	1472	National Gallery of Canada	
	Virgin and Child	82	Hans Memling / Hans Memling?	Hans Memling	1485	St Osyth's Priory	
	Virgin and Child	83	Hans Memling / Hans Memling?	Unknown	1480s	private collection	
	Triptych: Christ and the angels	84	Hans Memling / Hans Memling	Hans Memling	1489	Royal Museum of Fine Arts Antwerp (KMSKA)	
	Annunciation	85	Hans Memling / Hans Memling	Hans Memling	1480	Metropolitan Museum of Art	
	Saint Jerome	86	Hans Memling / Hans Memling	Hans Memling	1485	Kunstmuseum Basel	
	Three paintings: Saint Gregory's mass, Saint Michael and Saint Jerome	87	Hans Memling / Rogier van der Weyden, unknown painter from the school of	Master of the Legend of Saint Catherine	1490s	Metropolitan Museum of Art	
	Portrait of a man in a turban (formerly described as Portrait of Philip the Brave, Duke of Burgundy)	88	Petrus Christus / Unknown	Unknown	1460s	Metropolitan Museum of Art	
	Triptych: Virgin and Child, and two Angels playing music	89	Hans Memling / Unknown, start of the 16th century	Unknown	1480s	private collection	
	Saint James the Greater	90	Unknown /	Unknown	c. 1530	1902: collection Vincent Bareel; current location unknown	
	Christ being mourned by Mary, Saint John and Mary Magdalen	91	Hans Memling / Hans Memling	Hans Memling	1485	Doria Pamphilj Gallery	
	Triptych: Christ being mourned by Mary, Saint John and Mary Magdalen, Saint Jacob Major and Saint Christopher	92	Hans Memling / Hans Memling	Hans Memling	1480	Museum Boijmans Van Beuningen	
	Wings of a triptych: John the Baptist and Saint Jerome	93	Hans Memling / Adriaen Isenbrandt	Adriaen Isenbrandt	1529	Museum Catharijneconvent	
	Virgin and Child	94	Rogier van der Weyden / Anonymous Brabant artist, 2nd half of the 15th century	Follower of Dirk Bouts	1480	Sold at Christie's London in 1998 for £95,000	
	Christ appears to the Virgin	95	Dieric Bouts /	Aelbrecht Bouts	1490	Nivaagaard	
	Portrait of a Lady	96	Jan van Eyck(school of) / Rogier van der Weyden, school of	Rogier van der Weyden		private collection	
	Wings of a triptych: John the Baptist and John the Evangelist, and Saint Margarita and Saint Apollonia	97	Rogier van der Weyden / Rogier van der Weyden, school of	Unknown		private collection	
	Virgin and Child	98	Jan Van Eyck / Unknown, first half of the 16th century, Jan van Eeckele?	Jan Provoost	1495	Metropolitan Museum of Art	
	Virgin and Child with inkwell	99	Unknown / Unknown, Bruges, last quarter of the 15th century	Master of the André Virgin	1520	Musée Jacquemart-André	
	Left wing of a diptych: Portrait of Francis de Chateaubriand Presented by St. Maurice	100	Unknown / Jean Perréal	Jean Hey	1500	Kelvingrove Art Gallery and Museum	
	Left wing of a diptych: A canon protected by Saint Jerome	101	Rogier van der Weyden /	Simon Marmion	1475	Philadelphia Museum of Art	
	The Emperor surrounded by electors	102	School of Brabant /	Rogier van der Weyden	1470s	Schloss Rohrau	
	Portrait of Philip I of Castile	103	Unknown /	Master of the Story of Joseph	1550s	Schloss Mosigkau	
	Portrait of Philip I of Castile	104	Unknown / Unknown	Unknown	1525	St. Salvator's Cathedral	
	Mater Dolorosa	105	Jan van Eeck / Jan van Eeckele, probably	Jan van Eeckele	1490s	St. Salvator's Cathedral	
	Episodes from the Life of Saint Bernhard	106	Jan van Eeck / Jan van Eeckele	Jan van Eeckele	1450s	Musée des Beaux-Arts Tournai	
	Virgin and Child	107	Hugo van der Goes / Hugo van der Goes	Unknown		private collection	
	Portrait of a young lady	108	Unknown / Rogier van der Weyden	Rogier van der Weyden	1460	National Gallery of Art, Washington	
	Wings of a triptych: The donor protected by Saint John l'Aumônier (right) and The donor's wife protected by Sainte Godelieve (left)	109	Unknown / Jan Provoost	Jan Provoost	1520s	Groeningemuseum	Hulin was the first to recognise these as belonging to the same triptych as #157: these are the insides of the wings, the #157 were the outside of the wings (i.e. what one would see when the triptych was closed)
	Wings of a triptych: David receives a message (right) and Salomon vitised by the Queen of Sheba (left)	110	Unknown / Unknown, Brabant?	Master of the legend of St. Barbara	1480	Metropolitan Museum of Art	
	The Virgin appearing to Saint Ildefonso	111	Hans Memling /	Master of the Pacully collection	1480	private collection	
	Triptych: Virgin and Child, Saint Catherine and Saint Barbara	112	Unknown / Unknown	Workshop of Quentin Metsys	1510s	1902: Holy Cross Church (called Jerusalem Church), Bruges; Adornesdomein	
	Virgin and Child	113	Unknown / Rogier van der Weyden, school of	Unknown	1470s	Museum Mayer van den Bergh	
	Virgin and Child surrounded by angels	114	Unknown /	Master of the Legend of Saint Lucy	1500	Royal Museums of Fine Arts of Belgium	
	Saint Luc paints the Virgin and Child	115	Unknown / Dieric Bouts	Unknown	1500	National Trust	
	Saint Luke Drawing the Virgin	116	Unknown / Rogier van der Weyden or old copy after	Rogier van der Weyden	1435	Museum of Fine Arts	
	Transfiguration	117	Unknown / Gerard David, school of	Gerard David	1520	Church of Our Lady, Bruges	
	Diptych: Virgin and Child (right) and Chrétien de Hondt, 30th abbot of Notre Dames des Dunes (Ter Duinen) (left)	118	Unknown / Unknown, Bruges, 1499, and other unknown, Bruges, after 1519	Master of 1499	1499	Royal Museum of Fine Arts Antwerp (KMSKA)	
	Predella of a retable: The taking of Jerusalem	119	Gerard van der Meire / Unknown, Ghent, c. 1480	Justus van Gent	1500	Museum of Fine Arts, Ghent	
	Calvary	120	Unknown, 1500 / Unknown, Bruges, c. 1500	Unknown	1500	St. Salvator's Cathedral	
	Descent from the Cross, with the donor protected by Saint Peter and Saint Paul	120.1	Unknown, 1500 /	Rogier van der Weyden	1460	Mauritshuis	
	Judgement of Cambyses	121	Gerard David / Gerard David	Gerard David	1498	Groeningemuseum	
	Judgment of Cambyses: the flaying of Sisamnes	122	Gerard David / Gerard David	Gerard David	1498	Groeningemuseum	
	Triptych: Baptism of Christ, The donor protected by John the Evangelist, and The first wife of the donor protected by Saint Elisabeth	123	Gerard David / Gerard David	Gerard David	1502	Groeningemuseum	
	Virgin and Child, surrounded by angels and virgin saints	124	Gerard David / Gerard David	Gerard David	1509s	musée des beaux-arts de Rouen	
	Triptych: Saint Anne with the Virgin and Child, Saint Nicolas, and Saint Anthony of Padua	125	Gerard David / Gerard David	Unknown	1510s	National Gallery of Art, Washington	
	Triptych: Descent from the Cross	126	Gerard David / Master of the Holy Blood	Master of the Holy Blood	1510s	Basilica of the Holy Blood	
	Dead Christ	127	Gerard David / Master of the Holy Blood	Gerard David	c. 1530	1902: Collection Bethune, Bruges; current location unknown	
	Annunciation	128	Gerard David / Gerard David	Gerard David	1506	Metropolitan Museum of Art	
	The preaching of John the Baptist and The Baptism of Christ	129	Gerard David /	Simon Bening	1510	Groeningemuseum	
	Triptych: Virgin and Child, Saint Catherine and Saint Barbara	130	Cornelia Cnoop / unknown, traditionallyCornelia Cnoop	Simon Bening	1520	Museum of Fine Arts	
	The descent of the Holy Spirit on Pentecost (miniature)	131	Gerard David, school of / Gerard David(school of)	Unknown	1480	Fitzwilliam Museum	
	Virgin and Child	132	Unknown / Unknown, Flanders, probably Bruges	Unknown	c. 1530	1902: Collection of the Earl of Crawford, London; current location unknown	
	Virgin and Child	133	Gerard David / Unknown, Flanders, probably Bruges	Unknown	1495	Minneapolis Institute of Art	
	Two wings of a polyptych: John the Baptist (right) and Vision of Saint Francis (left)	134	Gerard David / Gerard David	Gerard David	1490s	Metropolitan Museum of Art	
	Adoration of the Magi	135	Unknown / Gerard David	Gerard David	1490	Royal Museums of Fine Arts of Belgium	
	Adoration of the Magi	136	Unknown / Unknown, c. 1520–1530	Unknown	1510s	Groeningemuseum	
	Ecce Homo	137	Jeroen Bosch / Jeroen Bosch	Hieronymus Bosch	1495s	Städel	
	Wing of a triptych: Saint Francis of Assisi and Saint Jerome	138	Unknown / Gerard David	Unknown	1510s	Gemäldegalerie	
	Virgin and Child	139	Gerard David / Gerard David, school of	Gerard David	c. 1530	1902: Suermondt Museum, Aken; current location unknown	
	Virgin and Child	140	Dieric Bouts / Hans Memling, follower	Unknown	1487	Metropolitan Museum of Art	
	Right wing of a triptych: John the Baptist, Mary Magdalen and the donor	141	Master of the Assumption / Aelbrecht Bouts	Aelbrecht Bouts	1500	Rheinisches Landesmuseum Bonn	
	Left wing of a triptych: Saint Andreas, Saint Catherine, and the donor	142	Master of the Assumption / Aelbrecht Bouts	Aelbrecht Bouts	1500	Rheinisches Landesmuseum Bonn	
	Portrait	143	Rogier van der Weyden / Unknown, c. 1480–1490	Master of the View of Ste-Gudule	1480	Metropolitan Museum of Art	
	Virgin and Child	144	Rogier van der Weyden / Rogier van der Weyden, unknown imitator of	Unknown	1530	private collection	
	Virgin and Child, surrounded by virgin saints	145	Gerard David / Adriaen Isenbrant	Adriaen Isenbrandt	1530	private collection	
	Portrait of an unknown man	146	Petrus Christus / Unknown, Bruges, 1510–1525	Master of the Brandon Portrait	1510	Mauritshuis	
	Saint Romold leaves his parents	147	Gerard David / Unknown, Bruges?, c. 1500	Unknown	1490	National Gallery of Ireland	
	Right wing of a diptych: The donor protected by Saint Clement	148	Unknown / Unknown, Franco-Flemish, c. 1475	Follower of Simon Marmion	Late 1480s	National Gallery	
	Eternal father	149	Jan van Eyck(school of) / Gerard David?	Gerard David	1506	Louvre	
	Saint Francis of Assisi turns his back to the world	150	Jan Gossaert / Unknown, Bruges, possible Jan Provoost	Unknown	1510	Philadelphia Museum of Art	
	The Virgin appears to Saint Ildefonso	151	Unknown / Adriaen Isenbrandt	Adriaen Isenbrandt	1500	Carnegie Museum of Art	
	Virgin and Child	152	Unknown / Adriaen Isenbrandt	Adriaen Isenbrandt	1530	Rijksmuseum	
	Virgin and Child	153	Unknown / Adriaen Isenbrandt, imitator of	Unknown	c. 1530	1902: collection Visart de Bocarmé, Bruges; current location unknown	
	Virgin and Child near a fountain	154	Jan Gossaert / Bernard van Orley?	Bernard van Orley	1518	Kelvingrove Art Gallery and Museum	
	Triptych: Virgo Deipara, Vision of the Ara Caeli, and Vision of Saint John on Pathmos	155	Unknown / Master of the Holy Blood, c. 1510	Master of the Holy Blood	1510	St. James Church	
	Saint Gregory's Mass	156	Unknown / Rogier van der Weyden, copy or imitator	Robert Campin; Master of Flémalle; Rogier van der Weyden	1440	Royal Museums of Fine Arts of Belgium	
	Diptych: Death and the miser	157	Unknown / Jan Provoost	Jan Provoost	1520s	Groeningemuseum	
	Virgin and Child, Saint Jacob Major, Saint Barbara, and the donor protected by Saint Peter	158	Unknown / Unknown, early 16th century	Master of Frankfurt	1505	Queensland Art Gallery	
	Saint Anna, the Virgin and Child, Saint Augustinus and Saint Jerome	159	Justus van Gent / Unknown, early 16th century	Justus van Gent	c. 1530	1902: collection C. Davis, London; current location unknown	
	The donor Antonio Siciliano protected by Saint Antonius	160	Jan van Eyck / Unknown, Antwerp?, painting in Italy early 16th century, Jan Gossaert?	Jan Gossaert	1508	Doria Pamphilj Gallery	
	Portrait (possibly Floris van Egmond)	161	Jan Gossaert / Jan Gossaert	Unknown	1520s	private collection	
	Diptych: Virgin and Child and Portrait of Willem van Bibaut	162	Unknown, c. 1520 /	Master of Willem van Bibaut; Master of the Legend of the Magdalen	1523	private collection	
	Polyptych: Death of the Virgin, Presentation of the Virgin, Annunciation, Visitation, Nativity, Presentation in the Temple and Adoration of the Magi	163	Bernard van Orley / Bernard van Orley or his workshop	Bernard van Orley	1520	Musée de l'Assistance Publique, Brussels	
	King Sapor of Persia humiliating Emperor Valerian	164	Bernard van Orley / Bernard van Orley, attributed?	Unknown	1520	Worcester Art Museum	
	Wings of a triptych: Mary Magdalene" and "Saint Mary of Egypt	165	Unknown / Quentin Matsys, style of	Quentin Matsys	1515	Philadelphia Museum of Art	
	Virgin and Child	166	Joachim Patinir / Unknown, Bruges, c. 1540–1550	Joachim Patinir	c. 1530	1902: collection Gustave Dreyfus, Paris; current location unknown	
	Last Judgment	167	Jan Provoost / Jan Provoost	Jan Provoost	1525	Groeningemuseum	
	Last Judgment	168	Jan Provoost / Jan Provoost	Jan Provoost	1500	Kunsthalle Hamburg	
	Last Judgment	169	School of Bruges, 15th century / Jan Provoost	Jan Provoost	1500	Fogg Museum	
	Central panel of a triptych: Crowning of the Virgin	170	Albert Cornelis / Albert Cornelis	Albert Cornelis	1520	St. James Church	
	Saint Bruno retiring to the Chartreuse	171	Unknown / Unknown, Bruges, third quarter of the 15th century	Unknown	1500s	1902: collection of baron Bethune, Bruges; current location unknown	
	Saint Jerome	172	Gerard David / Gerard David	Unknown	1501	National Gallery	
	Virgin and Child	173	Unknown / Unknown, Bruges, c. 1480–1490	Master of the (Bruges) Legend of St. Ursula	1488	Suermondt-Ludwig-Museum	
	Triptych: Virgin and Child, Saint Catherine and Saint Barbara	174	Unknown / Master of the Legend of the Magdalen	Master of the Legend of the Magdalen	1500	Museum Mayer van den Bergh	
	Wings of a triptych: The donor protected by Saint Andreas (right) and The donor's wife protected by Saint Catherine	175	Unknown / Unknown, Bruges, c. 1520	Unknown	1550s	1902: collection De Somzée, Brussels; current location unknown	
	Polyptych: The Eternal Father surrounded by angels, Death, Hell, Vanity, Skull, and some heraldic weapons	176	Hans Memling / Hans Memling	Hans Memling	1485	Musée des Beaux-Arts de Strasbourg	
	Triptych: Virgin and Child, and two Angels playing music	177	Unknown / Adriaen Isenbrandt	Adriaen Isenbrandt	1530	At auction in 2016 at Dumouchelles in Detroit for $250,000	
	Mater Dolorosa	178	Unknown, c. 1530 / Adriaen Isenbrandt	Adriaen Isenbrandt	1520	Church of Our Lady, Bruges	
	Right wing of a diptych: The donors Joris van de Velde and Barbara Le Marie and their children protected by Saint George and Saint Barbara	179	Unknown, c. 1530 / Adriaen Isenbrandt	Adriaen Isenbrandt	1520	Church of Our Lady, Bruges	
	Wings of a triptych: The donor protected by John the Evangelist (right) and The donor's wife protected by Saint Barbara (left)	180	Jan Mostaert / Adriaen Isenbrandt	Adriaen Isenbrandt	1530s	Richard von Kaufmann	
	Left wing of a diptych: A female donor protected by Mary Magdalen	181	Unknown / Jean Perréal	Jean Hey	1490	Louvre	
	Mary Magdalen in a landscape	182	Jan Mostaert / Adriaen Isenbrandt	Adriaen Isenbrandt	1510	National Gallery	
	Virgin and Child, the donor and his family	183	Master of the Seven Sorrows / Adriaen Isenbrandt	Adriaen Isenbrandt	1530s	Gallery Van Diemen in 1967, current location unknown	
	Triptych: Presentation of Christ, The donor Philip Wielant protected by Saint Philip, and The donor's wife Jeanne van Halewyn protected by John the Evangelist	184	Master of the Seven Sorrows / Adriaen Isenbrandt	Unknown	1510	St. Salvator's Cathedral	
	Saints Andreas, Michael, and Franciscus, and the Calvary	185	Gerard David / Adriaen Isenbrandt	Adriaen Isenbrandt	1530s	Museum of Fine Arts, Budapest	
	Calvary	186	Unknown / Unknown	Unknown	1490s	National Gallery in Prague	
	Saint Luc	187	Master of the Seven Sorrows / Adriaen Isenbrandt	Unknown	1530s	private collection	
	Mary Magdalen	188	Jan Mostaert / Adriaen Isenbrandt	Adriaen Isenbrandt	1530s	Palazzo Doria-Pamphilj	
	Diptych: Christ carrying the cross (right) and Portrait of a minor brother (left)	189	Unknown / Jan Provoost	Jan Provoost	1522	Old St. John's Hospital	
	Portrait of a canon	190	Quentin Matsys / Quentin Matsys	Quentin Matsys	1510s	Liechtenstein Museum; Eugène Secrétan	
	Triptych: Adoration of the Magi, The Descent of the Holy Spirit on Pentecost, and The glorious Virgin	191	Jan Gossaert / Unknown, Brabant c. 1520, certainly not by Gossaert	Jan Gossaert	1500s	private collection	
	Triptych: Saint Catherine and the philosophers	192	Jan Gossaert / Unknown, Brabant, c. 1520	Goswin van der Weyden	1510	Southampton City Art Gallery	
	Saviour	193	Unknown / Jan Provoost, school of	Unknown	1490	1902: Saint Gilles Church, Bruges; current location unknown	
	Mater Dolorosa	194	Unknown / Jan Provoost, school of	Unknown	1490	1902: Saint Gilles Church, Bruges; current location unknown	
	Triptych: Virgin and Child, John the Baptist and Saint Jerome	195	Pieter Pucheel / Adriaen Isenbrandt	Adriaen Isenbrandt	c. 1530	1902: collection Baron Bethune, Bruges; current location unknown	
	Christ at Emmaüs	196	Jan van Hemessen / Unknown, 16th century	Unknown	1530	Private collection	
	Wings of a triptych: Scenes from the legends of Saint Anthony and Saint Paul	197	Unknown / Unknown, Flanders, first half of the 16th century	Lancelot Blondeel	1530	City Archive, Nieuwpoort	
	Christ on the cross, the Virgin and Saint John	198	Joachim Patinir / Quentin Matsys	Quentin Matsys	1520	National Gallery of Canada	
	Triptych: Rest on the Flight to Egypt, John the Baptist and Saint Cornelius	199	Joachim Patinir / Joachim Patinir	Joachim Patinir	1516	private collection	Damaged by fire in 1904.
	Rest on the flight to Egypt	200	Joachim Patinir / Joachim Patinir	Joachim Patinir	1515	Thyssen-Bornemisza Museum	
	The miraculous fishing	201	Joachim Patinir / Jan van der Elburcht	Unknown	1520	Wadsworth Atheneum	
	Rest on the flight to Egypt	202	Unknown /	Unknown	c. 1530	1902: for sale at Colnaghi, London; current location unknown	
	Saint Jerome	203	Joachim Patinir / Joachim Patinir, school of	Joachim Patinir	c. 1530	1902: collection De Meester, Bruges; current location unknown	
	Saint Jerome	204	Joachim Patinir / Joachim Patinir, school of			1902: collection Helbig, Liège; current location unknown	
	Saint Jerome	205	C N A, 1547 / CNA or CMA, 1547	Cornelis Massijs	1547	Royal Museum of Fine Arts Antwerp (KMSKA)	
	Holy Trinity	206	Master of Flémalle / Master of Flémalle	Rogier van der Weyden	1430s	M - Museum Leuven	
	The preaching of a saint	207	Unknown / Unknown, 15th century			1902: Musée des Beaux-Arts Tournai; current location unknown	
	The glory of the Virgin	208	Unknown / Unknown, Bruges, second quarter of the 16th century	Albert Cornelis	1515	Brighton Museum & Art Gallery	
	Virgin and Child	209	Gerard David / Gerard David, workshop of	Unknown	1510	Musée des Beaux-Arts de Strasbourg	
	Virgin and Child	210	Unknown / Unknown, early 16th century	Master of the Khanenko Adoration	1490s	Schloss Mosigkau	
	Virgin and Child	211	Joachim Patinir / Joachim Patinir?	Unknown	1530s	Sold at Galerie Fischer in Luzern in 1987, current location unknown	
	Virgin and Child	212	Joachim Patinir / Adriaen Isenbrandt, school of	Adriaen Isenbrandt	1520s	Museum of Fine Arts, Ghent	
	Three angels	213	Master of Flémalle / Unknown, first half of the 16th century			1902: collection Charles-Léon Cardon, Brussels; current location unknown	
	The deposition	214	Rogier van der Weyden / Unknown, end of the 15th century	Adriaen Isenbrandt	1480s	Ashmolean Museum	
	Virgin and Child	215	Hans Memling / Hans Memling, school of, possiblyPasschier van der Mersch? Probably same artist as #140 above	Unknown	1490s	Metropolitan Museum of Art	
	Virgin and Child	216	Hans Memling / Unknown			1902: collection Simkens, Antwerp; current location unknown	
	Portrait	217	Gerard David /	Master of the Brandon Portrait	1515	Gemäldegalerie	
	The Virgin embracing the head of the dead Christ	218	Gerard David or workshop	Gerard David	1510s	private collection	
	John the Baptist (grisaille)	219	Unknown / Dieric Bouts, school of	Unknown	1480	Cleveland Museum of Art	
	Sibylle Persane	220	Jan Mostaert / Ambrosius Benson	Ambrosius Benson	1430s	private collection	
	Portrait of a young women as Mary Magdalen	221	Jan Gossaert / Jan Gossaert orBernard van Orley	Jan Gossaert	1530	Royal Museums of Fine Arts of Belgium	
	Portrait of a lady	222	Hans Memling / Unknown, c. 1540–1550			1902: collection Emile Pacully, Paris; current location unknown	
	Portrait of Justus van Bronckhorst	223	Unknown / Jan Mostaert	Jan Mostaert	1520	Petit Palais	
	Portrait of Margaretha of Austria	224	Jan Gossaert / Bernard van Orley	Bernard van Orley	1520	private collection	
	Hercules and Antaeus	225	Jan Gossaert / Jan Gossaert	Unknown	1523	private collection	
	Portrait of Richard III of England	226	Unknown / Unknown, English			1902: collection Charles-Leon Cardon, Brussels; current location unknown	
	Backside of the wing of a triptych: The prophet Elia and the widow of Sarepta	227	Unknown / Unknown, Bruges, c. 1510–1520	Unknown	1515	Groeningemuseum	
	Holy Family	228	Unknown /			1902: collection of Count d'Oultremont, Brussels; current location unknown	
	Virgin and Child	229	Unknown /			1902: collection C. Baus, Ypres; current location unknown	
	John the Baptist	230	Unknown / Unknown, first half of the 16th century			1902: at Colnaghi, London; current location unknown	
	Portrait of a lady	231	Unknown / Unknown, French, c. 1475?			1902: collection Somzée, Brussels; current location unknown	
	Portrait of a man	232	Unknown / Unknown, Dutch, c. 1520			1902: collection of Count Harrach, Vienna; current location unknown	
	Wing of a retable: Nativity	233	Herri met de Bles / Herri met de Bles	Jan de Beer	1520	Barber Institute of Fine Arts	
	Saint Christopher	234	Herri met de Bles / Unknown, first half of the 16th century	Master of Frankfurt	1520s	National Gallery in Prague	
	Rest of the Holy Family	235	Marcellus Coffermans / Marcellus Coffermans	Marcellus Coffermans	1560s	private collection	
	Triptych; Christ on the cross, the Virgin and Saint John	236	Joachim Patinir /			1902: collection Stowe, Buckingham; current location unknown	
	Christ with the crown of thorns	237	Master of the Assumption / Unknown, School of Leuven, end of the 15th century			1902: collection Götz Martius, Kiel; current location unknown	
	Christ	238	Quentin Matsys / Dieric Bouts or workshop	Aelbrecht Bouts	1490	1902: collection Somzée, Brussels; current location unknown	
	Christ	239	Quentin Matsys /			1902: collection Peyralbe, Brussels; current location unknown	
	Saint Jerome	240	Jan Matsys / Unknown, second quarter of the 16th century			1902: collection Peyralbe, Brussels; current location unknown	
	Judith with the head of Holophernes	241	Jan Matsys / Jan Matsys	Jan Matsys	1543	Museum of Fine Arts	
	Portrait of a man	242	Marinus van Reymerswaele / Unknown, Dutch, second quarter of the 16th century	Unknown	1530s	Philadelphia Museum of Art	
	Holy Family	243	Unknown / Jan Matsys			1902: collection Viscount de Ruffo Bonneval, Brussels; current location unknown	
	Christ mourned by his mother and the holy women	244	Unknown / Cornelis Engebrechtsz.	Unknown	1540s	private collection	
	Pieta	245	Unknown / Unknown, Dutch, end of the 15th century	Master of the Virgo inter Virgines	1480s	1902: collection Le Roy, Paris; current location unknown	
	Adoration of the Magi	246	Unknown / Unknown, Bruges, c. 1520	Simon Bening	1520s	Louvre	
	A Saint	247	Unknown / Unknown, German			1902: collection Bequet, Namur; current location unknown	
	Head of Christ	248	Quentin Matsys /			1902: collection Bequet, Namur; current location unknown	
	Front and back of the wings of a triptych: The Easter Lamb, The celestial manna, David dansing in front of the arch, Christ at Emmaüs	249	Gillis van Coninxloo / Not in exposition			Église de Saint Sauveur, Bruges	According to Hulin, this panel was not in the exposition
	Part of a triptych: Saint Nicolas of Tolentin	250	Unknown / Unknown, Bruges	Pieter Pourbus	1560s	Groeningemuseum	
	Saint Catherine	251	Unknown / Unknown, c. 1520–1530			1902: collection Van Speybrouck, Bruges; current location unknown	
	Christ with the crown of thorns	252	Unknown / Unknown, School of Leuven, fourth quarter of the 15th century	Aelbrecht Bouts	1490	private collection	
	Mater Dolorosa	253	Unknown / Unknown, School of Leuven, fourth quarter of the 15th century	Aelbrecht Bouts	1490	private collection	
	The miraculous fishing	254	Jan Rombouts I / Jan Rombouts I	Unknown artist		M - Museum Leuven	
	Calvary	255	Geertgen tot Sint Jans / Unknown, Dutch, c. 1510			1902: collection Glitza, Hamburg; current location unknown	
	Institution of the devotion of the rosary	256	Unknown /			1902: collection Turner, London; current location unknown	
	Portrait of a man	257	Lucas van Leyden / Lucas van Leyden	Aertgen van Leyden	1530	Thyssen-Bornemisza Museum	
	Portrait of Agatha van Schoonhoven, 1568	258	Jan van Scorel / Jan van Scorel?	Unknown	1568	private collection	
	Self portrait	259	Rogier van der Weyden / Joos van Cleve	Joos van Cleve	1519	Thyssen-Bornemisza Museum	
	Triptych: Holy Family, Saint Catherine and Saint Barbara	260	Master of the Death of the Virgin / Master of the Holy Blood	Master of the Holy Blood	1510s	Kunsthalle Hamburg	
	The martyrdom of Saint Matthew	261	Unknown / Unknown, German			1902: collection Oesterrieth-Mols, Antwerp	
	Pieta	262	Barthel Bruyn the Elder / Unknown, c. 1520			1902: at Sedelmeyer, Paris; current location unknown	
	A concert	263	Master of the Female Half-Lengths / Master of the Female Half-Lengths	Master of the Female Half-Lengths	ca. 1530	Schloss Rohrau	
	Rest in Egypt	264	Master of the Female Half-Lengths / Master of the Female Half-Lengths			1902: at Colnaghi, London; current location unknown	
	A lady writing a letter	265	Master of the Female Half-Lengths / Master of the Female Half-Lengths	Master of the Female Half-Lengths	1520s	private collection	
	Rest in Egypt	266	Master of the Female Half-Lengths / Master of the Female Half-Lengths	Master of the Female Half-Lengths	1510s	private collection	
	Wings of a triptych: Annunciation (right) and Visitation (left)	267	Gerard David /			1902: collection of Count of Harrach, Vienna; current location unknown	
	Virgin and Child	268	Gerard David / Gerard David or workshop			Collection of Baron of Bethune, Bruges; current location unknown	
	Virgin and Child	269	Dieric Bouts / Dieric Bouts? or workshop?			1902: collection of Count Pourtalès, The Hague; current location unknown	
	Triptych: Descent from the Cross, Crown of thorns and Ecce Homo	270	Master of Oultremont / Jan Mostaert	Jan Mostaert	1520s	Royal Museums of Fine Arts of Belgium	
	Descent from the cross	271	Quentin Matsys / Unknown, first half of the 16th century			1902: collection Novak, Prague; current location unknown	
	Triptych: Herodias receives the head of John the Baptist	272	Lucas van Leyden / Unknown, c. 1520, imitator of Lucas van Leyden?	Lucas van Leyden	1550s	1902: collection Somzée, Brussels; current location unknown	
	Head of Family at the Chateau of Rumbeke	273	Unknown / Unknown, Flemish, c. 1535	Master of the Female Half-Lengths	1530s	private collection	
	Triptych; Carrying the cross, Calvary and Resurrection	274	Unknown / Unknown, Bruges, c. 1520–1530, in the style of Herri met de Bles	Master of 1518	1510s	Basilica of the Holy Blood	
	Triptych: Virgin and Child, Saint Catherine and Saint Barbara, The donor protected by John the Baptist and The donor's wife protected by Saint Catherine	275	Unknown / Unknown, Bruges, c. 1530	Unknown	1500	Museo de Arte de Ponce	
	Annunciation	276	Master of the Death of Mary / Joos van Cleve	Joos van Cleve	1525	Metropolitan Museum of Art	
	Salomon visited by the Queen of Sheba and David refuses to drink the water of Bethlehem	277	Jan van Eyck / Herri met de Bles			1902: collection of Countess de Pourtalès, Paris; current location unknown	
	Virgin and Child	278	Quentin Matsys / Quentin Matsys, pupil of, perhaps his sonJan Matsys	Unknown	1540	Metropolitan Museum of Art	
	Crown of thorns	279	Bernard van Orley / Unknown, second quarter of the 16th century	Bernard van Orley	1530s	Lower Saxony State Museum	
	Carrying the cross	280	Bernard van Orley / Unknown, second quarter of the 16th century	Bernard van Orley	1530s	Oriel College	
	Triptych: Virgin and Child, Saint Peter protects two man and a little girl, and Mary Magdalen protects two women and a girl	281	Jacob Cornelisz van Oostsanen / Jacob Cornelisz van Oostsanen			1902: collection Miethke, Vienna; current location unknown	
	Episode from the Legend of Mary Magdalen	282	Unknown / Master of the Legend of the Magdalen	Master of the Legend of the Magdalen	1520s	Bode Museum	
	Preaching of Mary Magdalen	283	Unknown / Master of the Legend of the Magdalen	Master of the Legend of the Magdalen	1515	Philadelphia Museum of Art	
	Frame of an horloge	284	Quentin Matsys / Unknown, Leuven, c. 1500	Unknown	1500s	M - Museum Leuven	
	Christ Carrying the Cross	285	Hieronymus Bosch / Hieronymus Bosch	Hieronymus Bosch	1510s	Museum of Fine Arts, Ghent	
	Christ in Limbo	286	Hieronymus Bosch / Jan Mandijn?		1510	1902: collection of Count Harrach, Vienna; current location unknown	
	The temptation of Saint Anthony and Flemish Proverbs	287	Hieronymus Bosch / Hieronymus Bosch, after	Unknown	1500s	private collection	
	Last Judgment	288	Hieronymus Bosch / Hieronymus Bosch, unknown imitator of	Unknown	1500s	private collection	
	Garden of earthly delights	289	Hieronymus Bosch / Hieronymus Bosch, after	Unknown	1550s	Germanisches Nationalmuseum	
	Left wing of a diptych: The donor Margareta van Metteneye protected by Saint Margarita	290	Lancelot Blondeel / Lancelot Blondeel	Lancelot Blondeel	1525	Groeningemuseum	
	Scenes from the legend of Saints Cosmas and Damian	291	Lancelot Blondeel / Lancelot Blondeel	Unknown	1523	St. James Church	
	Saint Luc painting the Virgin and Child	292	Lancelot Blondeel / Lancelot Blondeel	Lancelot Blondeel	1545	Groeningemuseum	
	Madonna with the patron saints of the guild of painters of Bruges	293	Lancelot Blondeel / Lancelot Blondeel	Lancelot Blondeel	1545	St. Salvator's Cathedral	
	Christ healing the sick	294	Lucas Gassel / Lucas Gassel		1538	Sale from Weber collection, 1912: current location unknown	
	Vocation of Saint Matthew	295	Marinus van Reymerswaele / Marinus van Reymerswaele	Marinus van Reymerswaele	1530	Thyssen-Bornemisza Museum	
	Saint Jerome	296	Marinus van Reymerswaele / Marinus van Reymerswaele	Marinus van Reymerswaele	1541	Royal Museum of Fine Arts Antwerp (KMSKA)	
	Portrait of Otto Stochove	297	Unknown / Unknown, dated 1542	Ambrosius Benson	1542	Groeningemuseum	
	Portrait of Pierre Lootyns, 1557	298	Unknown / Unknown, Bruges, dated 1557	Unknown	1557	St. Salvator's Cathedral	
	Portrait of Jean Fernagant	299	Pieter Pourbus / Pieter Pourbus	Pieter Pourbus	1551	Groeningemuseum	
	Portrait of Jacquemyne Buuck	300	Pieter Pourbus / Pieter Pourbus	Pieter Pourbus	1551	Groeningemuseum	
	Triptych: Lady of Sorrows, The donor protected by Saint Josse and The donor's wife protected by Saint Catherine	301	Pieter Pourbus / Pieter Pourbus	Pieter Pourbus	1556	St. James Church	
	Wings of a triptych: Portraits of the members of the Brotherhood of the Holy Blood	302	Pieter Pourbus / Pieter Pourbus	Pieter Pourbus	1556	Basilica of the Holy Blood	
	Triptych: Last Supper, Meeting of Abraham and Melchidesek and Elia under the juniper tree	303	Pieter Pourbus / Pieter Pourbus	Pieter Pourbus	1559	St. Salvator's Cathedral	
	Portrait of Pierine Hellinc	304	Pieter Pourbus / Pieter Pourbus			1902: collection Coppieters 't Wallant, Bruges; current location unknown	
	Wings of a triptych: Saint Anthony (right) and Abbot Antonius Wydoot (left)	305	Pieter Pourbus / Pieter Claeissens the Elder?	Pieter Claeissens the Elder	1560s	Groeningemuseum	
	Portrait of a man	306	Pieter Pourbus / Pieter Pourbus	Pieter Pourbus	1574	private collection	
	Wings of a polyptych: Episodes of the Legend of Saint George	307	Unknown / Unknown, Bruges, c. 1490	Unknown	1500s	Groeningemuseum	
	Legend of Saint George	308	Lancelot Blondeel / Lancelot Blondeel	Lancelot Blondeel	1540	Groeningemuseum	
	Portrait of Robrecht Holman	309	Antoine Claeis / Pieter Claeissens the Elder?	Unknown	1571	1902: Seminary, Bruges; current location unknown	
	The Saviour adored by Robert Holman, abbot of Ter Duinen	310	Gilles Claeis / Gilles Claeis?	Pieter Claeissens the Elder	1565	private collection	
	Vision of Saint Bernard	311	Antoine Claeis /	Antoon Claeissens	1608	St. Salvator's Cathedral	
	Patron Saints of the guild of farmers, poultry merchants and dairies	312	Unknown, 1574 / Lancelot Blondeel, imitator of, probablyAntuenis Claeis	Pieter Claeissens	1574	Groeningemuseum	
	Portraits: three men	313	Frans Pourbus / Frans Pourbus?			1902: collection Verhaeghen, Merelbeke; current location unknown	
	The flagellation	314	Unknown / Unknown, Brussels, c. 1510–1520	Master of the Beighem Altarpiece	1520s	Beigem	
	Ecce Homo	315	Unknown / Unknown, Brussels, c. 1510–1520; same artist as 314	Master of the Beighem Altarpiece	1520s	Beigem	
	Calvary	316	Unknown / Unknown, Brussels, c. 1510–1520; same artist as 314	Master of the Beighem Altarpiece	1520s	Beigem	
	Resurrection	317	Unknown / Unknown, Brussels, c. 1510–1520; other artist than 314-316	Master of the Beighem Altarpiece	1520s	Beigem	
	Wings of a triptych: Doctors of the Church	318	Unknown / Unknown, Antwerp? or Guelders?, c. 1510?	Unknown	1510	private collection	
	Last Supper	319	Unknown / Unknown, France	Unknown	1490s	Art Institute of Chicago	
	Saint Hugh of Lincoln	320	Unknown / Unknown, France	Unknown	1490s	Art Institute of Chicago	
	Episode of the Legend of Saint George	321	Unknown / Unknown, School of Avignon, first half of the 15th century	Bernat Martorell	1435s	Louvre	
	Portrait of a man	322	Lucas van Leyden / Unknown, Italian (Lombard?), date unknown	Unknown	1525	Metropolitan Museum of Art	
	Adoration of the magi	323	Rogier van der Weyden / Unknown, Flanders, c. 1500	Justus van Gent	1490s	private collection	
	Agony in the garden	324	Joachim Patinir / Unknown, c. 1515			1902: collection S. Röhrer, Munich; current location unknown	
	Pieta	325	Petrus Christus / Petrus Christus	Petrus Christus	1435; 1435s	Louvre	
	Adoration of the magi	326	Unknown / Unknown c. 1520–1530	Hugo van der Goes	1505	Saint Louis Art Museum	
	Triptych: Adoration of the magi, Annunciation and Nativity, and Flight to Egypt and Presentation in the Temple	327	Margareta van Eyck / Unknown, c. 1515–1525			1902: collection Donaldson, London; current location unknown	
	Virgin and Child between two groups of angels	328	Unknown / Jan Gossaert, copy after	Jan Gossaert	1513	private collection	
	The vision of Saint Bernard	329	Unknown / Unknown, Brabant, first half of the 16th century	Unknown	1500s	private collection	
	Virgin and Child	330	Jan Gossaert / Bernard van Orley	Bernard van Orley	1520	Polesden Lacey	
	Portrait of Lady Heneage	331	Hans Holbein the Elder / Unknown, France			1902: collection Simon, Berlin; current location unknown	
	The Conversion of Saint Paul	332	Jacob Cornelisz van Oostsanen / Unknown, Ghent? or Tournai?	Jehan Bellegambe	1520s	1902: collection Verhaeghen, Merelbeke; current location unknown	
	Baptism of Christ	333	Joachim Patinir / Joachim Patinir, school of	Joachim Patinir	c. 1530	1902: Musée des Beaux-Arts Tournai; current location unknown	
	Center and left wing of a triptych: Birth of the Virgin and The meeting of Joachim and Anna	334	Unknown / Unknown, Flanders, c. 1520–1530	Unknown	1520s	Groeningemuseum	
	Descent from the cross	335	Unknown /			1902: collection Jurié de Lavandal, Vienna; current location unknown	
	Portrait of Pierre de Cuenync	336	Unknown / Unknown, Bruges, dated 1609	Pieter Claeissens	1609	St. Salvator's Cathedral	
	Portrait of Leonard Neyts	337	Unknown / Unknown, Bruges, end of the 16th century			1902: St. Salvator's Cathedral; current location unknown	
	Man of sorrows	338	Unknown / Jan Mostaert	Unknown	1520s	National Gallery	
	Pilatus washing his hands	339	Unknown / Unknown, German			1902: collection of Viscount de Ruffo Bonneval, Brussels; current location unknown	
	Portrait of Abel van de Coulster	340	Master of Oultremont / Jan Mostaert?	Jan Mostaert	1510s	Royal Museums of Fine Arts of Belgium	
	Episodes from the legend of Saint Joseph	341	Unknown / Jacques Daret, copy after	unknown	1450s	St. Catherine's Church, Hoogstraten	
	Virgin and Child	342	Unknown / Jan Provoost	Jan Provoost	1510	Musée des Beaux-Arts de Strasbourg	
	Virgin and Child	343	Quentin Matsys / Gerard David, possibly	Unknown	1520	private collection	
	A minor brother praying in front of bishops	344	Unknown /	Rogier van der Weyden	1470s	private collection	
	(Mistake in catalogue: same as 217)	345	/			(Mistake in catalogue: same as 217)	
	Virgin and Child	346	Petrus Christus / Unknown, Flanders, 16th century	Rogier van der Weyden	1460s	Museum Godshuis Belle	
	Christ on the cross, the Virgin and Saint John	347	Master of the Death of Maria / Joos van Cleve	Joos van Cleve	c. 1530	1993: sold at Sotheby's: current location unknown	
	A Saint	348	Unknown /			1902: collection Schloss, Paris; current location unknown	
	Triptych: Descent from the cross, The donor protected by Saint Louis and An Augustin canon, protected by John the Evangelist	349	Unknown / Unknown, Flanders, 16th century			1902: collection Carpentier, Beernem; current location unknown	
	Virgin and Child	350	Unknown / Quentin Matsysor his workshop	Quentin Matsys	1490	sold at the Dorotheum in 1999	
	Portrait of a man	351	Quentin Matsys / Quentin Matsys?	Quentin Matsys	1517	Musée Jacquemart-André	
	Descent in limbo	352	Jean Bellegambe / Unknown, Spain? or Tyrol?			1902: collection Thibaut-Sisson, Paris; current location unknown	
	Triptych: Calvary, Carrying the cross, and Descent from the cross	353	Unknown / Unknown, Ghent? or Tournai?, c. 1515–1525; later work from the same hand as 332	Cornelis Engebrechtsz.	1520s	Seminary school of Tournai	
	Calvary	354	Unknown / Unknown	Unknown	1520	Rijksmuseum	
	Christ chasing the merchants from the Temple	355	Hieronymus Bosch / Hieronymus Bosch, imitator of	Unknown	1580s	Kelvingrove Art Gallery and Museum	
	Adoration of the magi	356	Pieter Bruegel the Elder / Pieter Bruegel the Elder			1902: collection Rott, Vienna; current location unknown	
	The Land of Cockaigne	357	Pieter Bruegel the Elder / Pieter Bruegel the Elder	Pieter Brueghel the Elder	1567	Alte Pinakothek	
	The Census at Bethlehem	358	Pieter Bruegel the Elder / Pieter Bruegel the Elder	Pieter Brueghel the Elder	1566	Royal Museum of Fine Arts Antwerp (KMSKA)	
	The ill-matched lovers	359	Quentin Matsys / Quentin Matsys	Quentin Matsys	1520	National Gallery of Art, Washington	
	Triptych: Descent from the cross, Saint Philip, and The donor protected by Saint George	360	Antoon Claeissens / Antoon Claeissens	Antoon Claeissens	1609	St. Salvator's Cathedral	
	Wings of a triptych: The donor Juan II Pardo protected by John the Evangelist (right) and The wifes of the donor protected by Saint Anna and the Virgin	361	Antoon Claeissens / Antoon Claeissens	Antoon Claeissens	1580	Groeningemuseum	
	Calvary	362	Unknown / Unknown, Brabant, early 16th century			1902: collection Viscount de Ruffo Bonneval, Brussels; current location unknown	
	Holy Family	363	Unknown / Unknown, second quarter of the 16th century			1902: collection Thibaut-Sisson, Paris; current location unknown	
	Christ on the cross, the Virgin and Saint John	364	Unknown / Adriaen Isenbrandt, style of			1902: collection De Bruyne, Antwerp; current location unknown	
	Mater Dolorosa	365	Rogier van der Weyden / Unknown	Unknown	1500	1902: collection Van Speybrouck, Bruges; current location unknown	
	Triptych: Virgin and Child, a Bishop-Saint, and Saint Louis	366	Gillis van Coninxloo / Unknown, Brabant, c. 1530?	Unknown	1520s	National Gallery	
	Saint Christoph	367	Herri met de Bles / Unknown			Sale from Weber collection, 1912: current location unknown	
	Triptych: Temptation of Saint Anthony	368	Pieter Bruegel the Elder / Hieronymus Bosch, imitator of	Unknown	1550s	Georgium	
	Adoration of the magi	369	Unknown /			1902: collection Snyers, Brussels; current location unknown	
	Saint Donatian	370	Jan Gossaert / Jan Gossaert	Jan Gossaert	1520	Musée des Beaux-Arts Tournai	
	Wing of a triptych: John the Evangelist and Saint Agnes	371	Quentin Massys / Quentin Massys	Quentin Matsys	1510s	Wallraf-Richartz Museum	
	Virgin and Child	372	Quentin Massys / Unknown, c. 1515–1525	Master of the Mansi Magdalen	1520	Metropolitan Museum of Art	
	Christ	373	Unknown / Quentin Massys, after			1902: collection of Baron de Schickler, Paris; current location unknown	
	Triptych: Saints Christoph, Jerome and Anthony	374	Unknown / Unknown, Brabant, first half of the 16th century	Master of the Legend of the Magdalen	1510s	Museum Mayer van den Bergh	
	Triptych: Christ mourned by his mother, Saint John and the Holy Women, Saint Anna, the Virgin and Child and Saint Francis receiving the stigmata	375	Herri met de Bles / Herri met de Bles, style of			1902: collection Turner, London; current location unknown	
	Holy Family	376	Master of the Death of Mary / Joos van Cleve, copy	Unknown	1530s	private collection	
	The agony of Christ in the Garden of Olives	377	Unknown / Master of the Holy Kinship	Unknown	1489	private collection	
	Six apostles	378	Unknown / Unknown, German	Derick Baegert	1550	Royal Museums of Fine Arts of Belgium	
	Calvary	379	Unknown, 16th century / Jacob Cornelisz van Oostsanen			1902: collection Viscount de Ruffo Bonneval, Brussels; current location unknown	
	Triptych: Adoration of the magi, Nativity and The presentation in the Temple	380	Rogier van der Weyden / Unknown, Utrecht, c. 1520–1530	Unknown	1510	1902: collection Glitza, Hamburg; current location unknown	
	Portrait of a monk	381	Rogier van der Weyden / Unknown, late 15th century	Unknown	1480	National Gallery of Art, Washington	
	Two monks in prayer (The Hypocrites)	382	Unknown / Quentin Massys, imitator of	Unknown	1520	Doria Pamphilj Gallery	
	Saint Anna, the Virgin and Child	383	Unknown /	Unknown	1530	private collection	
	Episodes from the life of the Virgin	384	Unknown / Lancelot Blondeel?	Lancelot Blondeel	1550	Tournai Cathedral	
	Virgin and Child	385	Unknown / Adriaen Isenbrandt			1902: collection of Baron Surmont de Volsberghe, Ypres; current location unknown	
	Portrait of a man, 1541	386	Unknown /			1902: collection of the Count of Harrach, Vienna; current location unknown	
	Portrait of a man	387	Frans Pourbus / Adriaen Key			1902: collection Porgès, Paris; current location unknown	
	Descent from the cross	388	Unknown / Hugo van der Goes, copy after? 16th century	Unknown	1470s	Musée des Beaux-Arts Tournai	
	The creation of Eve, the sin of Adam, the expulsion from Paradise	389	Unknown /			1902: St Martin's Cathedral, Ypres; current location unknown	
	Christ with the crown of thorns	390	Unknown / Bernard van Orley?			1902: Tournai Cathedral	
	Christ carrying the cross	391	Lucas van Leyden / Hendrick Goltzius?			1902: collection Schloss, Paris; current location unknown	
	Christ insulted by the soldiers	392	Lucas van Leyden / Hendrick Goltzius?			1902: collection Schloss, Paris; current location unknown	
	Last Supper, Passion and Resurrection	393	Hendrick Goltzius /			1902: collection Cardon, Brussels; current location unknown	
	Christ chasing the merchants from the Temple	394	Quentin Massys /	Quentin Matsys	1520s	Royal Museum of Fine Arts Antwerp (KMSKA)	
	Diptych: The conversion of Saint Paul (right) and The fall of Simon the magician (left)	395	Jan van Rillaer /	Jan Rombouts I	1520s	M - Museum Leuven	
	Christ in Emmaüs	396	Herri met de Bles / Unknown, mid-16th century			1902: collection Helbig, Liège; current location unknown	
	Adoration of the magi	397	Unknown / Unknown, Bruges, c. 1510	Unknown	1500s	Groeningemuseum	
	Holy Family	398	Unknown / Unknown			1902: collection Novak, Prague; current location unknown	
	Descent from the cross	399	Jan Massys /			1902: collection Novak, Prague; current location unknown	
	Virgin and Child	400	Unknown / Unknown			1902: collection Servais, Liège; current location unknown	
	Portrait of a young man	401	Unknown / Unknown, second half the 16th century			1902: collection Errera, Brussels; current location unknown	
	Descent from the cross	402	Unknown / Unknown, Flanders, c. 1540			1902; collection Iweyns d'Eeckhout, Sint-Kruis-Brugge; current location unknown	
	Saint Jerome	403	Jan Massys / Unknown			1902: collection Van Even, Leuven; current location unknown	
	Saint Barbara	404	Unknown / Unknown, Flanders, probably Bruges, c. 1500	Master of the Embroidered Foliage	1500	Museum Boijmans Van Beuningen	
	Saint Catherine	405	Unknown / Unknown, Flanders, probably Bruges, c. 1500, same hand as 404, wings of same triptych?	Master of the Embroidered Foliage	1500	Museum Boijmans Van Beuningen	
	The meeting between Esau and Jacob	406	Lambert Lombard / Unknown			1902: collection Scheen, Vonck; current location unknown	
	Portrait of a woman carrying a vase of flowers	407	Bernard van Orley /			1902: at Sedelmeyer, Paris; current location unknown	
	Wings of the libraries of the abbey Ter Duinen with the portraits of the abbots and the counts and countesses of Flanders	408-413	Unknown / Unknown, Bruges, dated 1480	Unknown	1480	Bruges seminary	
	Adoration of the Magi	414	Ambrosius Benson /	Ambrosius Benson	1530	private collection	not in catalog
