= Gemäldegalerie (disambiguation) =

Gemäldegalerie (German for picture gallery) may refer to various museums in the German-speaking world:

- Gemäldegalerie in Berlin, Germany
- Gemäldegalerie Alte Meister (picture gallery of the Old Masters) in Dresden, Germany
- Galerie Neue Meister (picture gallery of the New Masters), sometimes known as Gemäldegalerie Neue Meister, in Dresden, Germany
- Anhaltische Gemäldegalerie (picture gallery of Anhalt) in Dessau, Germany
- The first floor of the Kunsthistorisches Museum in Vienna, Austria is called the Gemäldegalerie
- Die Gemäldegalerie at the Academy of Fine Arts in Vienna, Austria
