= Bibaut diptych =

Devotional diptych assembled by Guilielmus Bibaucus

- Diptych with the Virgin and Child and the Donor Willem van Bibaut
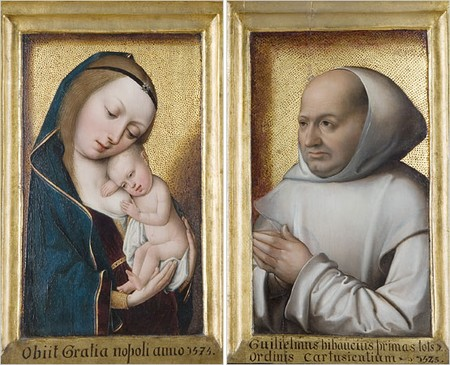
- Artist: Master of the Legend of the Magdalen
- Year: c. 1530 (Julian)
- Medium: oil paint, panel
- Dimensions: 30.4 cm (12.0 in) × 20.7 cm (8.1 in)
- Location: Rijksmuseum, Brod Gallery
- Owner: Hans Wetzlar
- Accession: SK-C-1777

The Bibaut diptych or Virgin and Child and Portrait of Willem van Bibaut is a circa 1523 devotional diptych assembled by the monk Guilielmus Bibaucus (1484–1535), whose portrait with praying hands forms the right panel. It is in a private collection but was on long-term loan to the Rijksmuseum in 2016.

When the diptych was shown in the 1902 exhibition in Bruges it included a short biography of the donor. Bibaucus, or Bibaut, had been sent to Leuven to become a scholar. He became a tutor in Ghent, but one day when lightning struck his classroom, he vowed to join the Cartusians and became a monk in the Ghent monastery in his teens. At the young age of 16 he became prior in Geertruidenberg and in 1523 he became prior of the order in the Grande Chartreuse monastery near Grenoble.

For years it was assumed the entire diptych was made at the same time, but an uncanny similarity between the Madonna and a similar one in the Museum Mayer van den Bergh led to closer inspection of the wood and hinges, leading some to conclude that the panels were made by different artists at different times.

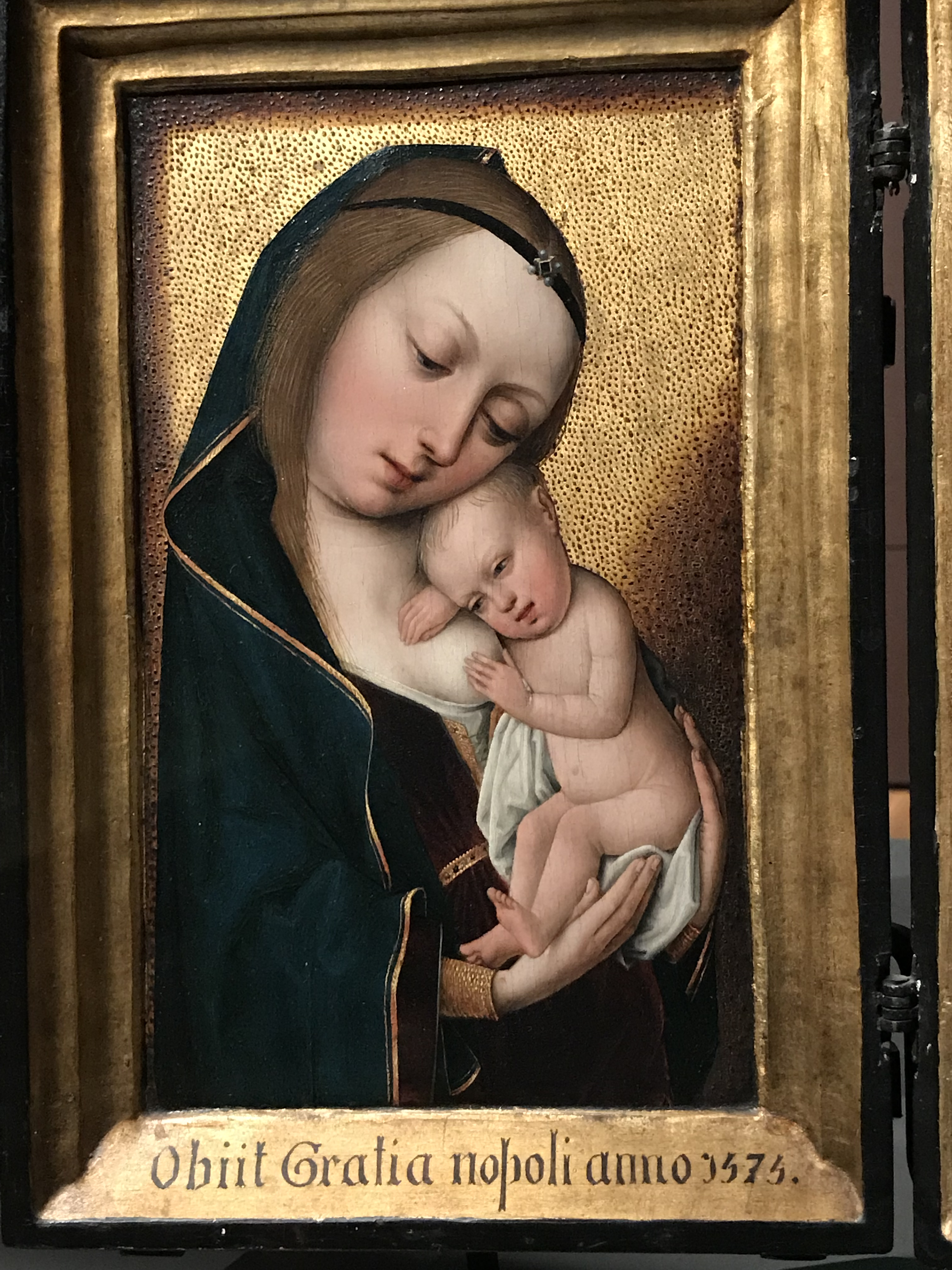
Left panel

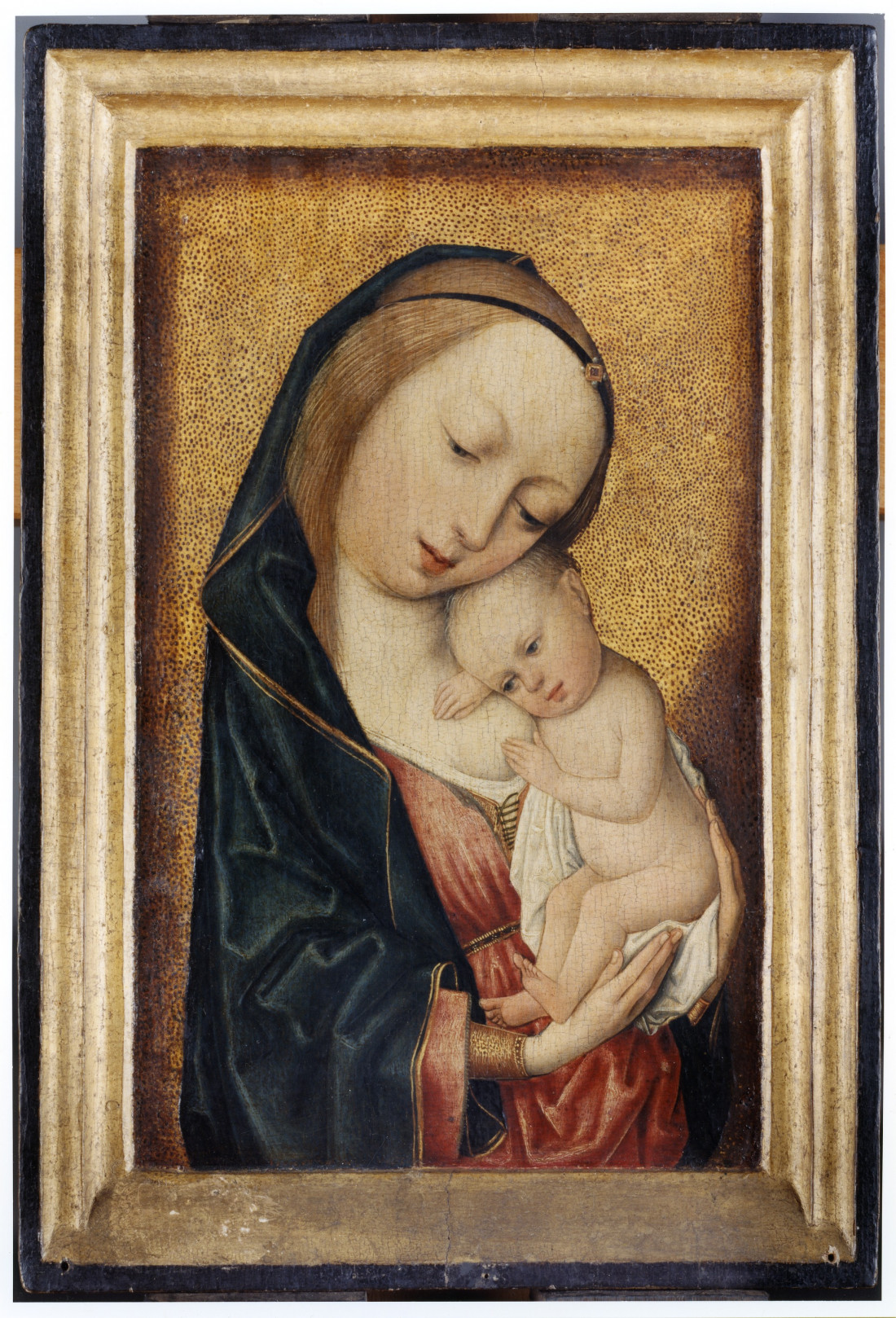
Panel in Antwerp

The Rijksmuseum has catalogued the diptych as two distinct panels; the left-hand Madonna circa 1490 on oak panel by the Master of the Legend of the Magdalen and the right-hand portrait circa 1523 on walnut panel by an unknown painter of either Flemish or French origin. The idea of the portrait being French was born from the idea it was commissioned on the occasion of Bibaut's 1521 appointment, because he wrote about the Five Holy Wounds as a devotional subject and such a subject is painted on the other side of the walnut panel his portrait is painted on.

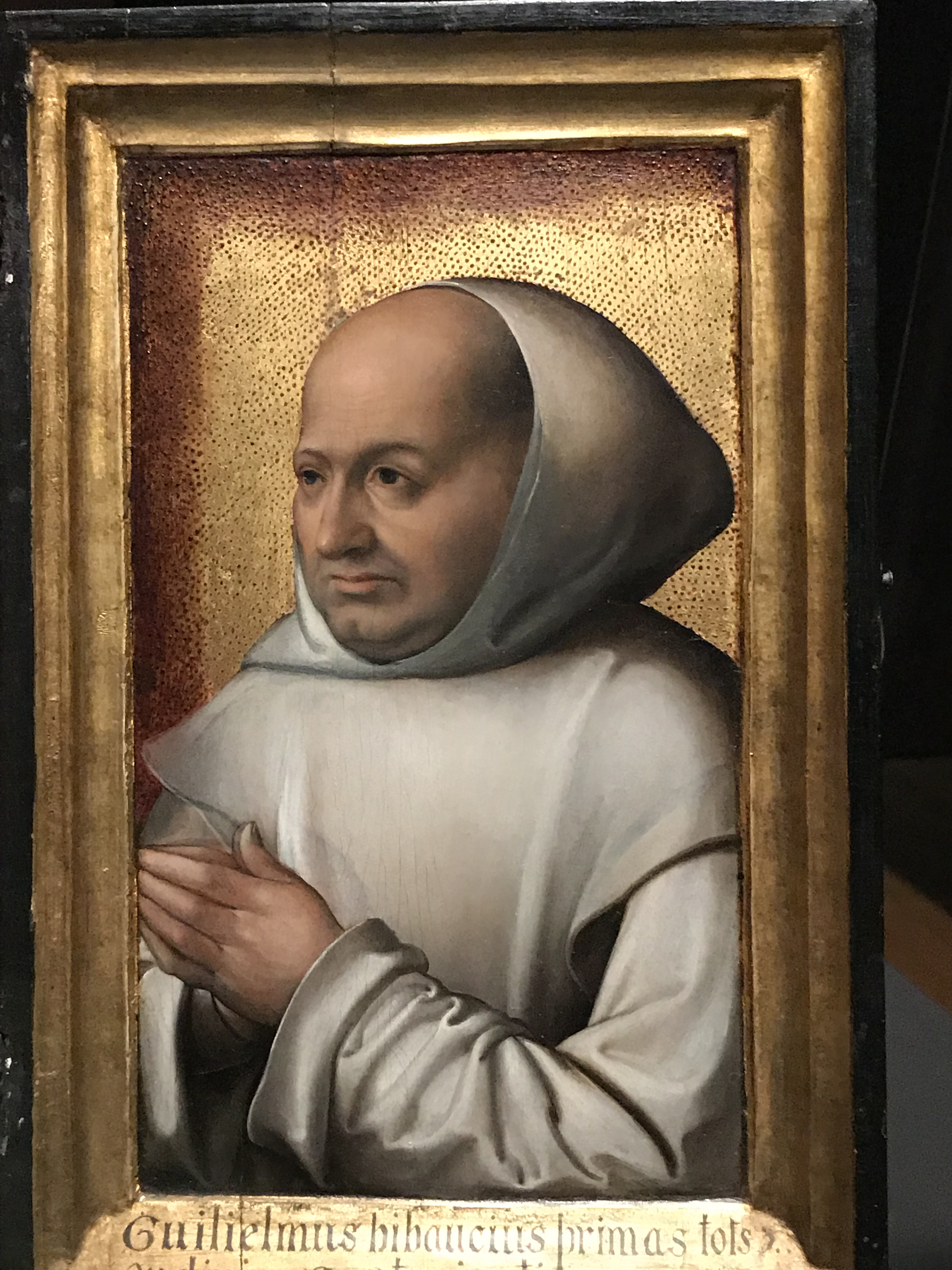
Portrait of the prior

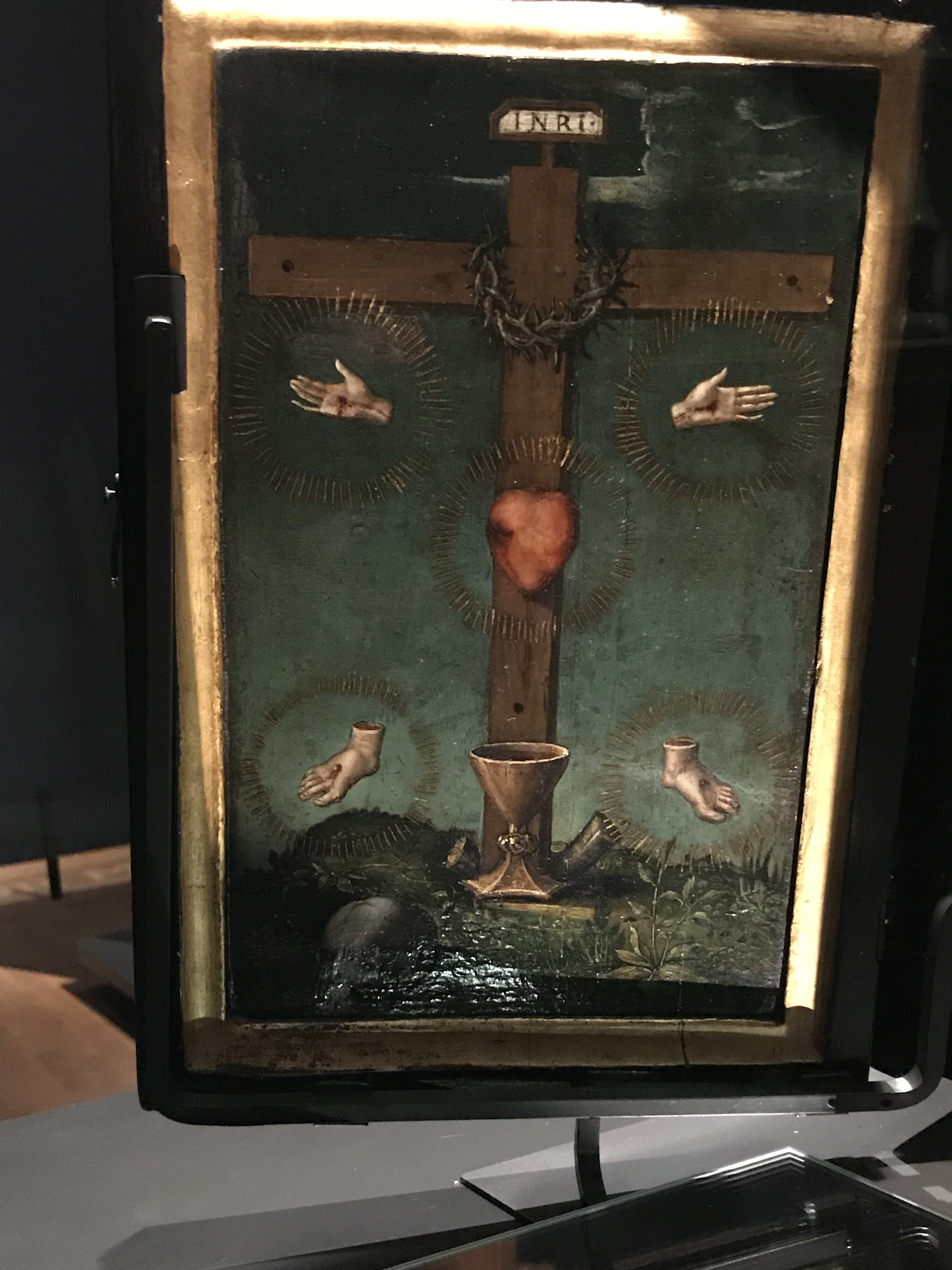
Devotional subject painted on the back

The panel was lent to the 2006 National Gallery of Art exhibition Prayers and Portraits, Unfolding the Netherlandish Diptych and that catalog discusses the small portable devotional diptychs such as this one that became prevalent around the 1520s. That catalog also references a 1994 article by Marc Rudolf de Vrij in Oud Holland who claimed the dating of the portrait could be 1523 because the sitter's age could be 40. De Vrij then goes on to dispute the attribution of the Madonna to Master of the Legend of the Magdalen, and claims it is more likely to be a follower of a Rogier van der Weyden style. In 2021 the diptych featured in the Rijksmuseum portrait exhibition Remember Me.
