= Jan van Eeckele =

- Born: 1520
- Died: 1561 (aged 40–41); Bruges

Jan van Eeckele or Van Eekele or Van Heckele (1520 – 1561) was an Netherlandish painter active in Bruges.

Van Eeckele became a master of the Guild of St. Luke in Bruges in 1534, where he remained until his death. Works by him shown at the 1902 Exposition des primitifs flamands à Bruges were a Mater Dolorosa from the cathedral of St Salvator in Bruges, and a Lactatio Bernardi from the church of the Black (Augustinian) Sisters. In his critical catalog of the 1902 exhibition, Georges Hulin de Loo stated that Jan van Eeckele is the same person as the Monogrammist J.V.E.

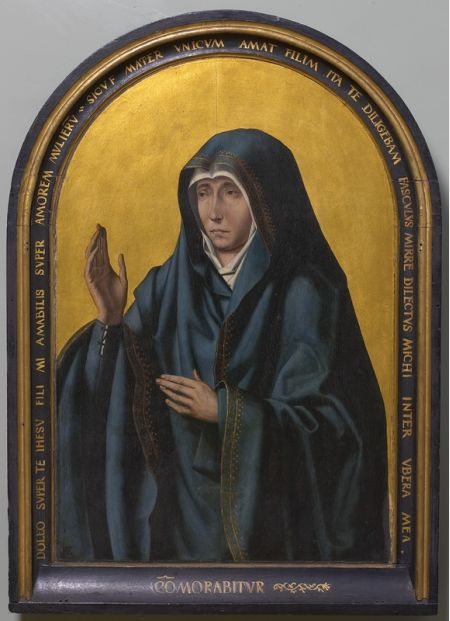
Mater Dolorosa

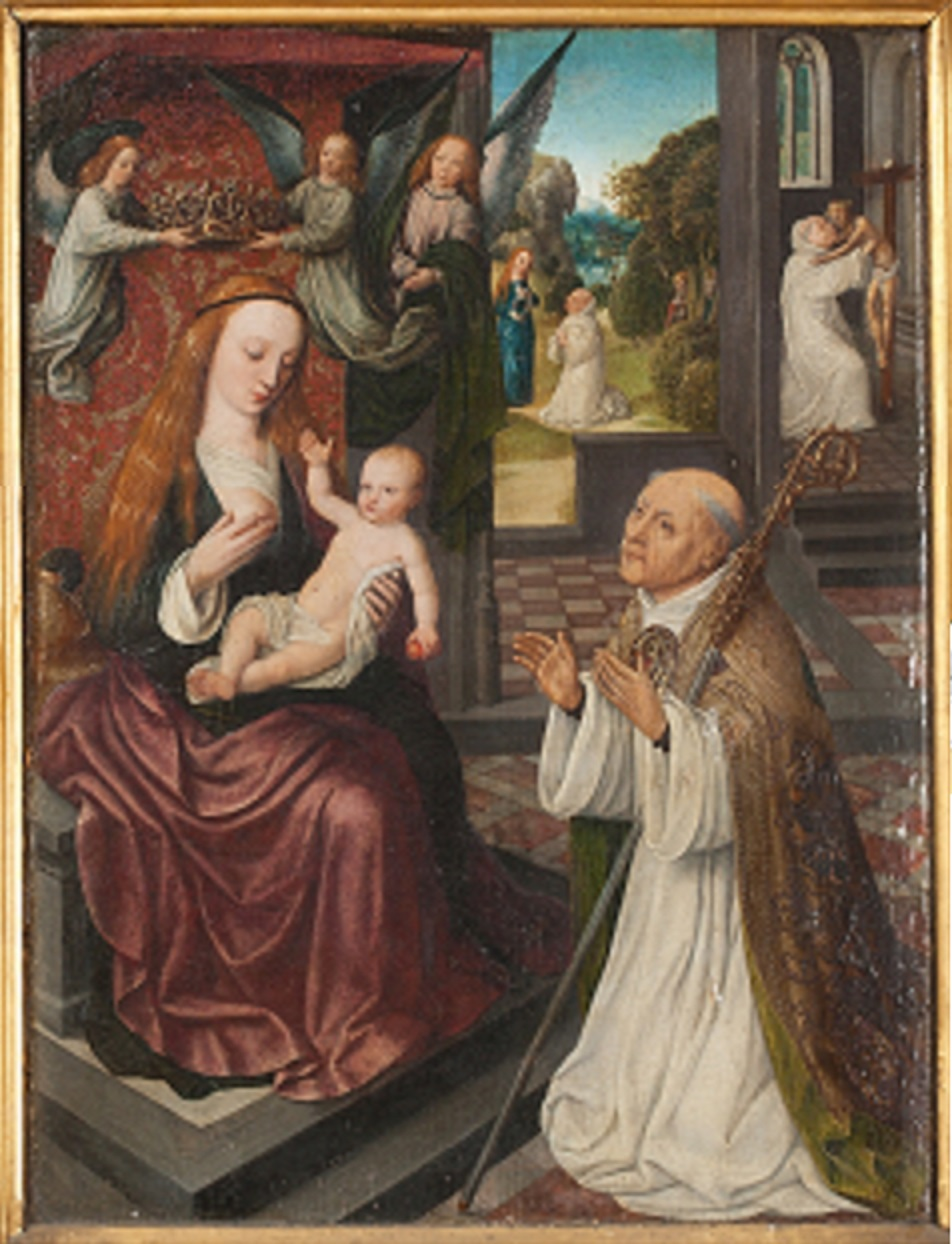
Lactatio Bernardi

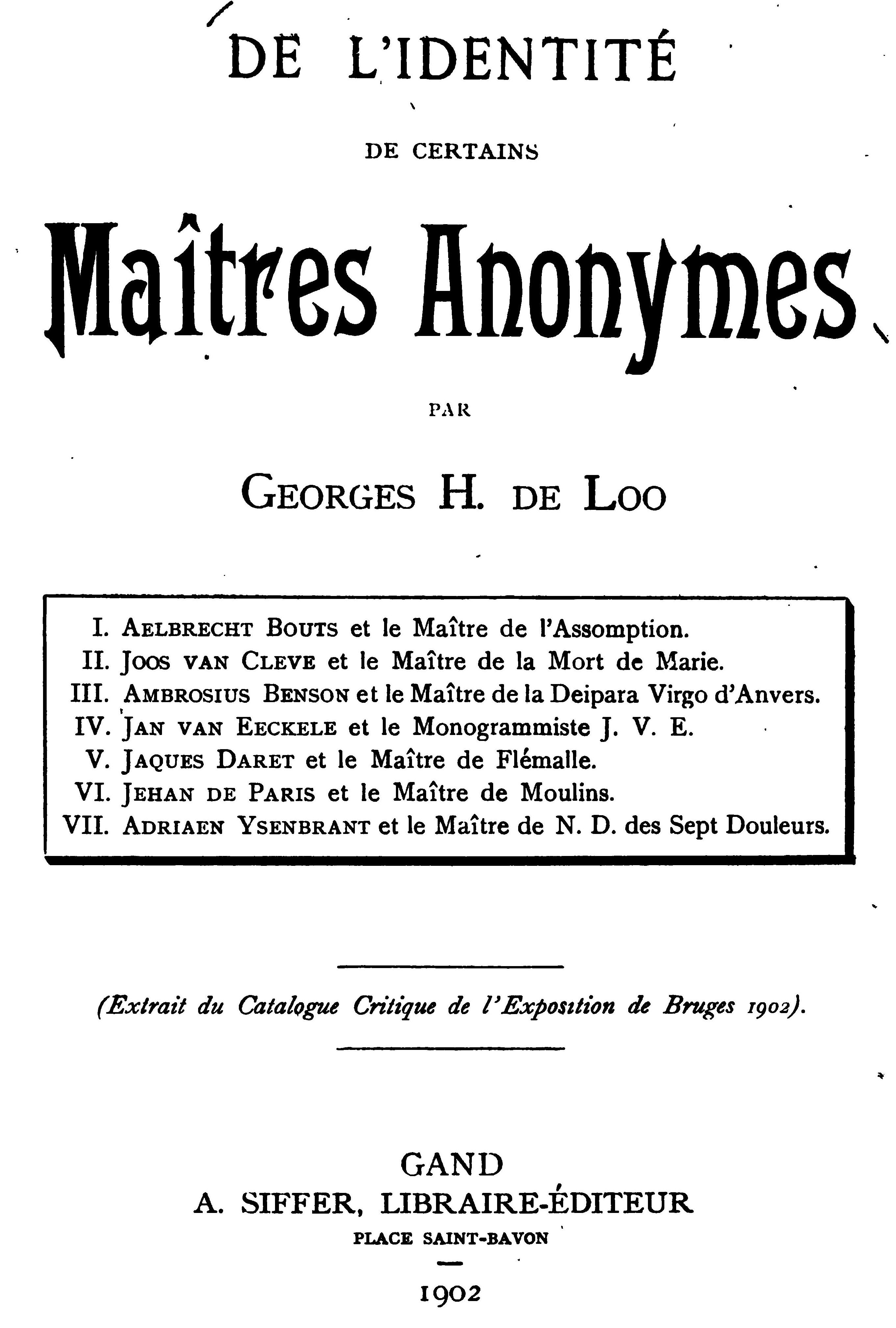
Extract of Hulin de Loo's critical catalog, 1902
