= Ill-Matched Lovers (Matsys) =

Painting by Quentin Massys

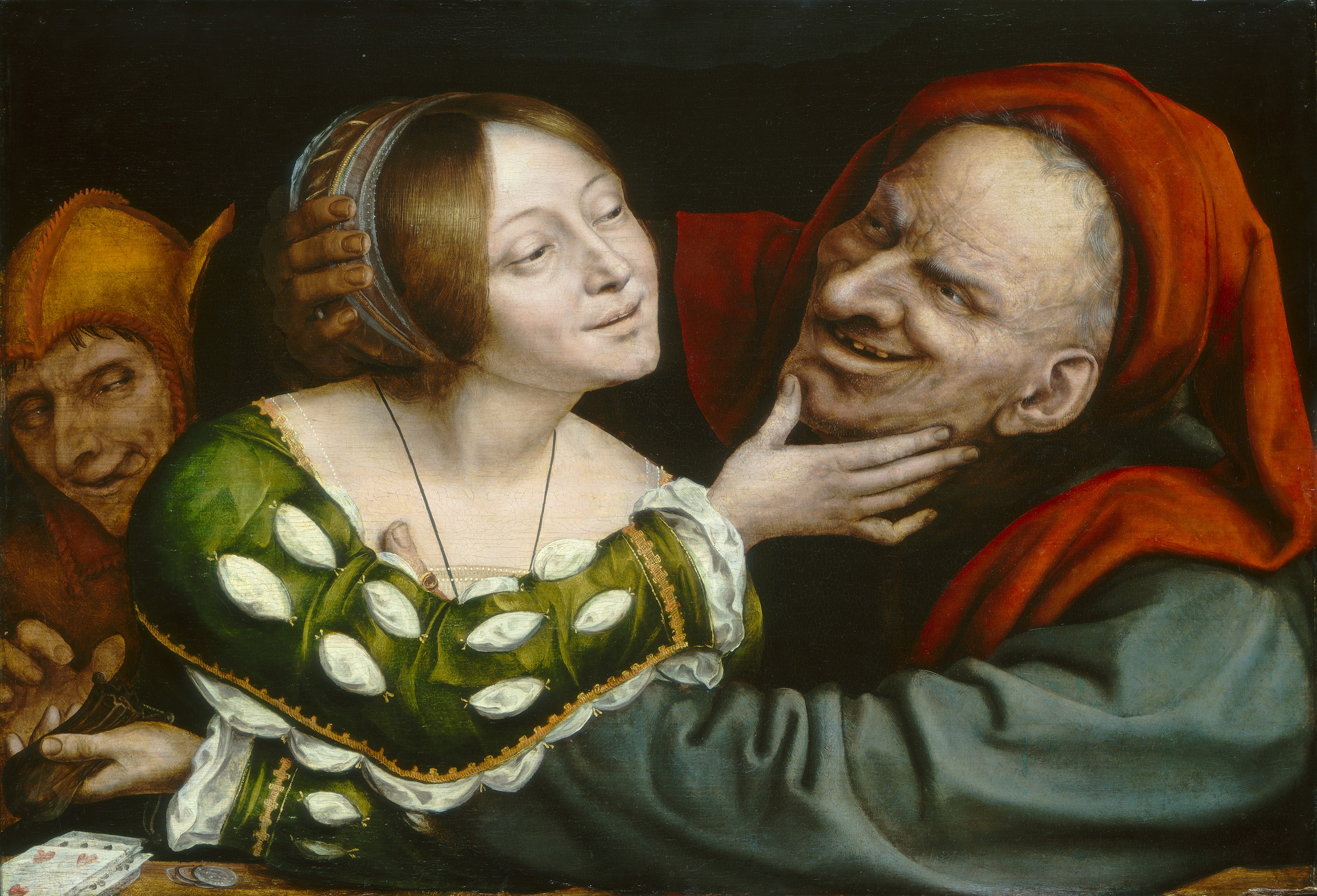
- Artist: Quentin Matsys
- Year: ca. 1520-1525
- Medium: oil on panel
- Dimensions: 43.2 cm × 63 cm (17.0 in × 25 in)
- Location: National Gallery, Washington DC

The Ill-Matched Lovers is an oil painting by the early Netherlandish master Quentin Matsys, usually dated between 1520 and 1525. In the collection of the National Gallery of Art in Washington since 1971, the painting depicts the trope that old age can make one foolish. Matsys depicts this theme by showing an older man besotted by a younger, beautiful woman. He gazes at her adoringly, not noticing that with the aid of an accomplice, she is stealing his purse. The face of the old man was influenced by a drawing done by Leonardo da Vinci, demonstrating Matsys’ skill in combining Northern European themes with Italian elements.

The picture was exhibited at the Exhibition of Flemish Primitives at Bruges in 1902.

== Bibliography ==
- Snyder, James. Northern Renaissance Art: Painting, Sculpture, the Graphic Arts from 1350 to 1575. Revised by Larry Silver and Henry Luttikhuizen. Upper Saddle River: Prentice-Hall, 2005: 442, 443 fig. 18.13.
- Hand, John Oliver. National Gallery of Art: Master Paintings from the Collection. Washington and New York: Harry N. Abrams, 2004: 130–131, no. 99, color repro.
- Hand, John Oliver and Martha Wolff. Early Netherlandish Painting. The Collections of the National Gallery of Art Systematic Catalogue. Washington, National Gallery of Art, 1986: 146–150, repro. 147.
- Silver, Larry. The Paintings of Quinten Massys, with Cataloque Raisonné. Montclair, New Jersey: Allanheld & Schram, 1984: 10, 24, 79, 143–145, 223–224, no. 35, pl. 129.
- Stewart, Alison. Unequal Lovers. A Study of Unequal Couples in Northern Art. New York: Abaris Books, 1979: 68–71, 146, no. 18, fig. 40.
