= Museum Godshuis Belle =

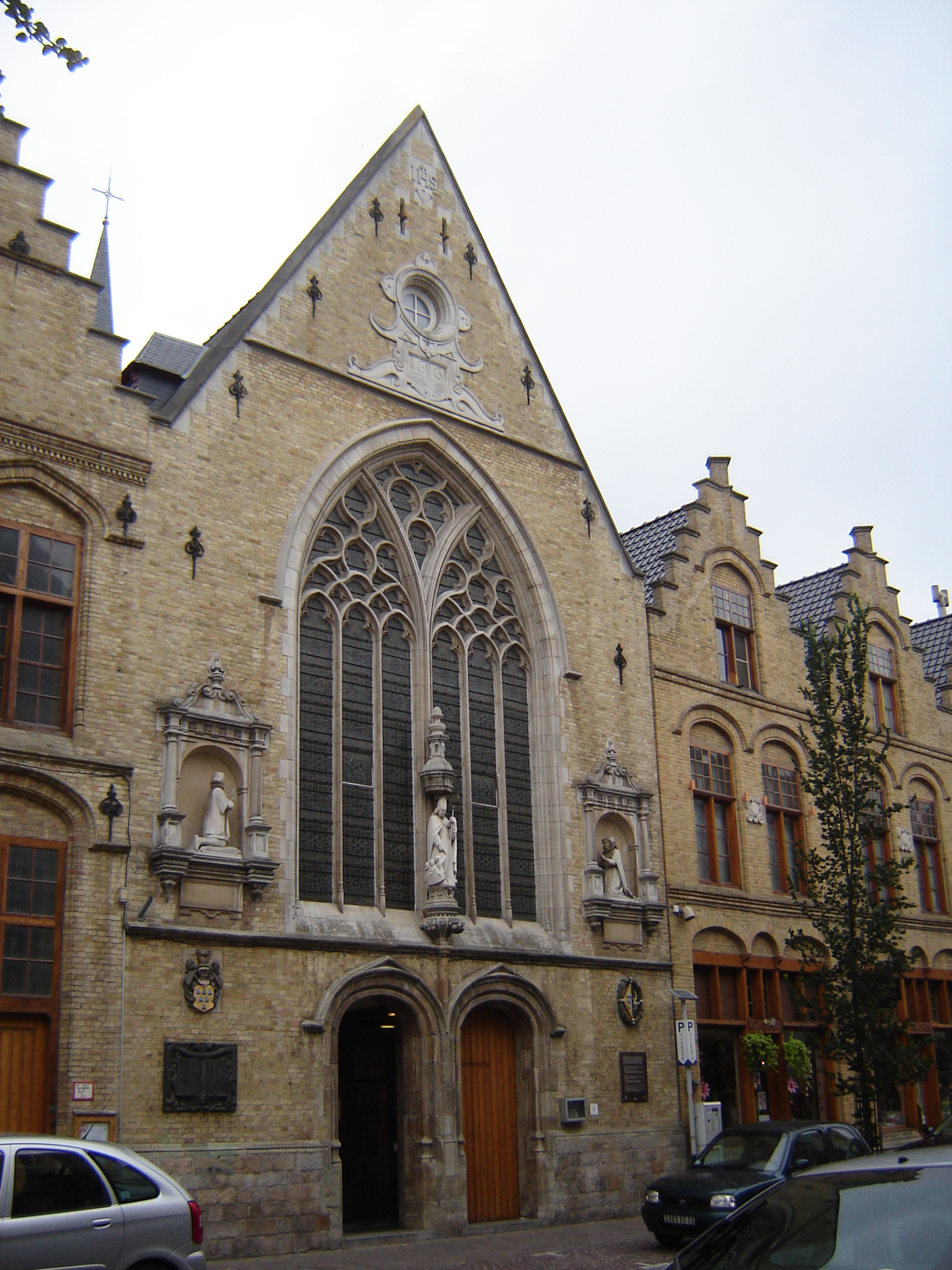
- Exterior view of the Museum Godshuis Belle

- Location within Belgium
- Established: 1273
- Location: Ypres, West Flanders, Belgium
- Coordinates: 50.8497°N 2.8862°E
- Type: Art museum and gallery
- Architects: Georges Lernould and Jules Coomans
- Parking: On site
- Website: Museum Godshuis Belle

The Museum Godshuis Belle is a small museum in Ypres, Belgium. Located in the chapel of an old almshouse, it houses the art collection of the Ypres Public Centre for Social Welfare (OCMW in Dutch).

== History ==
During the broadcloth crisis of 1270–1274, many people in Ypres became poor and needed support. A charitable institution was established in c.1273 by Christine de Guinness, the widow of Salomon Belle. By 1276, it had been expanded with a chapel and a hospital. Jehan Yperman, the first medical writer in Dutch, worked in the foundation from 1304 until his death in 1331. In 1616, a new chapel was built.

Until 1796, the Godshuis was headed by descendants of Salomon Belle. It then became a civic institution, used especially for the care of the elderly. It remains in use today and forms the main establishment of the Ypres OCMW. The former chapel now serves as the Museum Godshuis Belle.

Like most of Ypres, the site was destroyed during the First World War, and rebuilt afterwards. The architects were Georges Lernould and Jules Coomans, who drew up some of the plans, but died before building work had started. They partly reconstructed the old buildings, and partly made new Gothic Revival buildings. The chapel was rebuilt in 1933–1934, with a reconstructed interior.

The building became a protected heritage site in 1940.

== Collection ==
The most important painting in the collection is a painting of the Virgin with the donors, Joos Bryde and Yolenthe Belle, and their children. It was painted in 1420 by an unknown artist (sometimes called the Master of 1420) and is one of the oldest examples of panel painting in Flanders. The rest of the collection includes more paintings by old masters, a 17th-century altar draping, and a 17th-century linen-press.

== Notes ==
- Museum Godshuis Belle
