= Master of the Holy Blood =

Early Netherlandish painter

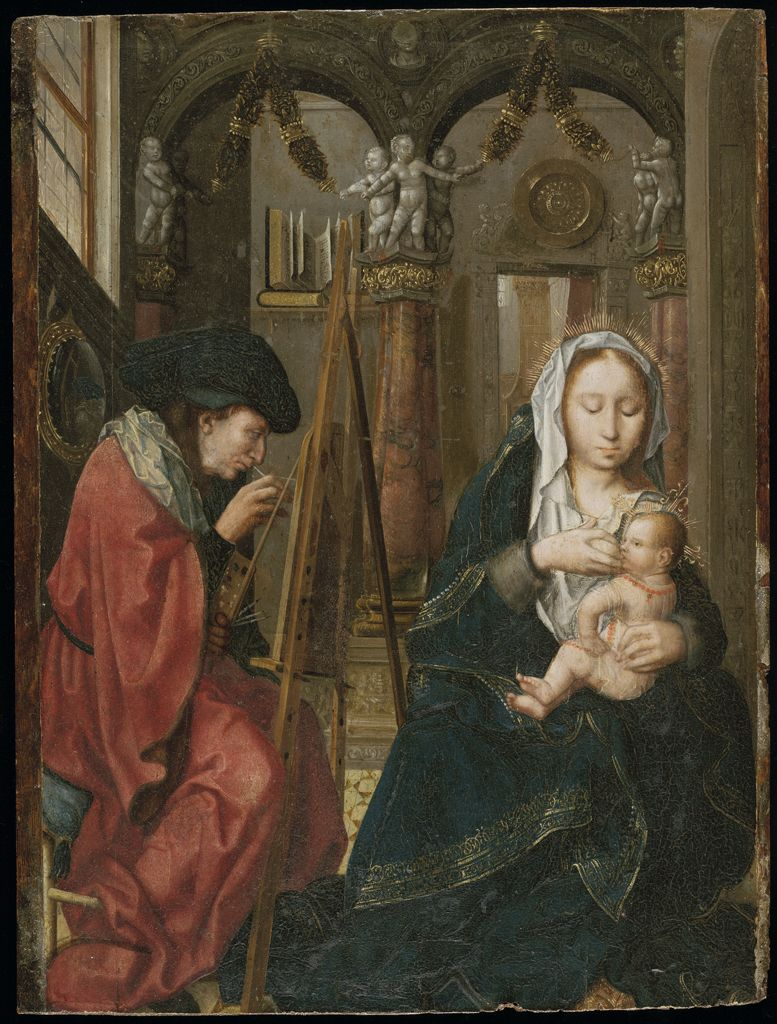
Saint Luke painting the Virgin, Fogg Art Museum

Master of the Holy Blood (active 1510–1520) was an Early Netherlandish painter, whose workshop was located in Bruges (Belgium).

Little is known of his/her life. This painter is named after a work in the Museum of the Holy Blood, which has remained in the same location through the centuries.

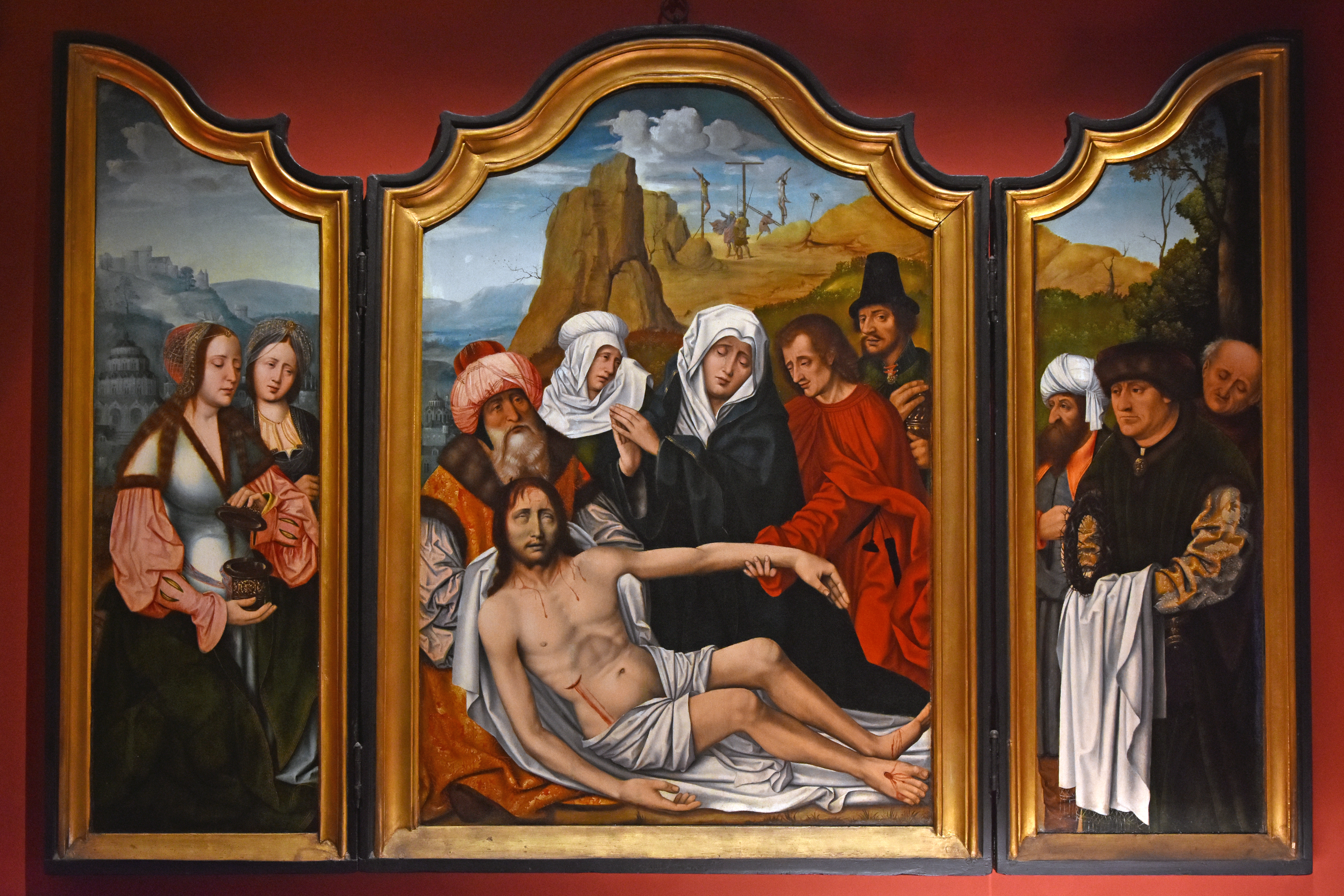
Triptych for which this painter is named
