= Master of the View of Saint Gudula =

Early Netherlandish painter

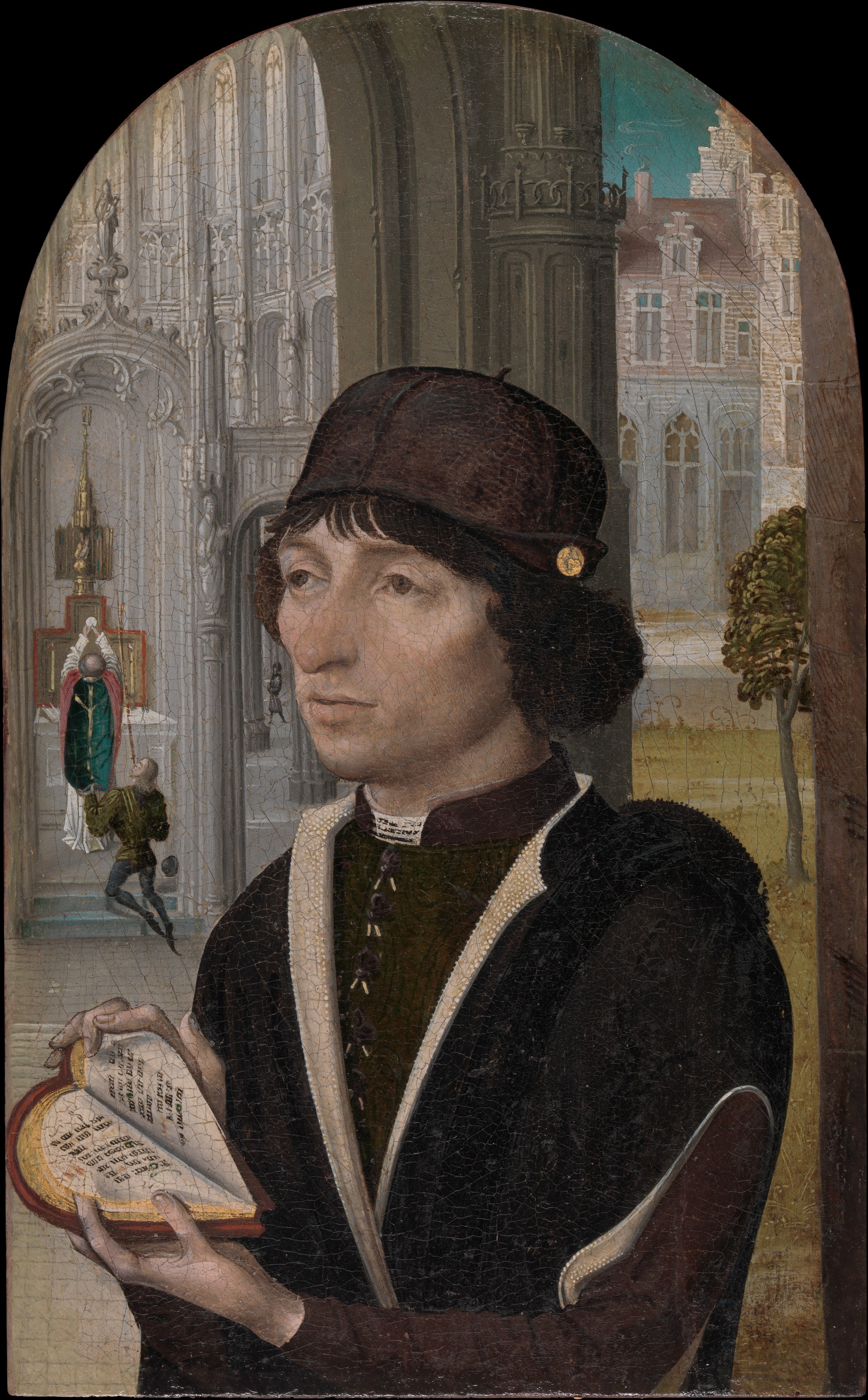
Portrait of a young man, Metropolitan Museum of New York

The Master of the View of Saint Gudula (active 1480 – 1499), was an Early Netherlandish painter active in Brussels in the last quarter of the 15th century.

== Biography ==
He was born in Brussels and is known for portraits of prominent church patrons and other religious works. His work is sometimes confused with that of other Antwerp or Brussels painters of his day.
