= Master of the Beighem Altarpiece =

16th-century Flemish painter

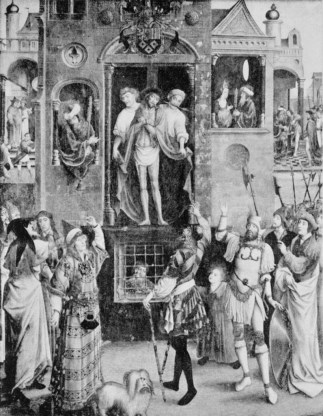
Pilate shows Jesus to the People, one of four paintings stolen from Beigem in 1914

The Master of the Beighem Altarpiece (Note: the placename is Beigem, with the Dutch spelling; Beighem or Beyghem is the French spelling.) is a little-known Flemish painter who was active in Brussels during the first third of the sixteenth century, using a Gothic style with classical influences.

Their name comes from a series of four paintings that depicted the Flagellation of Jesus, Pontius Pilate showing Jesus to the people, the Crucifixion of Jesus and the Resurrection of Jesus. These paintings were held in the church at Beigem near Brussels, now incorporated into Grimbergen, until 13 September 1914, when they were stolen just before the church was set on fire by the Germans in World War I. They are currently only known from photos. In 2014 the city council of Grimbergen offered a reward of 400,000 euros for information regarding the paintings.

Other paintings ascribed to this painter include a depiction of Christ in the Garden of Gethsemane in the Musée des Beaux-Arts in Dijon and one of Christ before Pilate in the Philadelphia Museum of Art.
