= Master of the André Virgin =

Southern-Netherlandish painter

- Born: c.1500
- Died: 16th-century

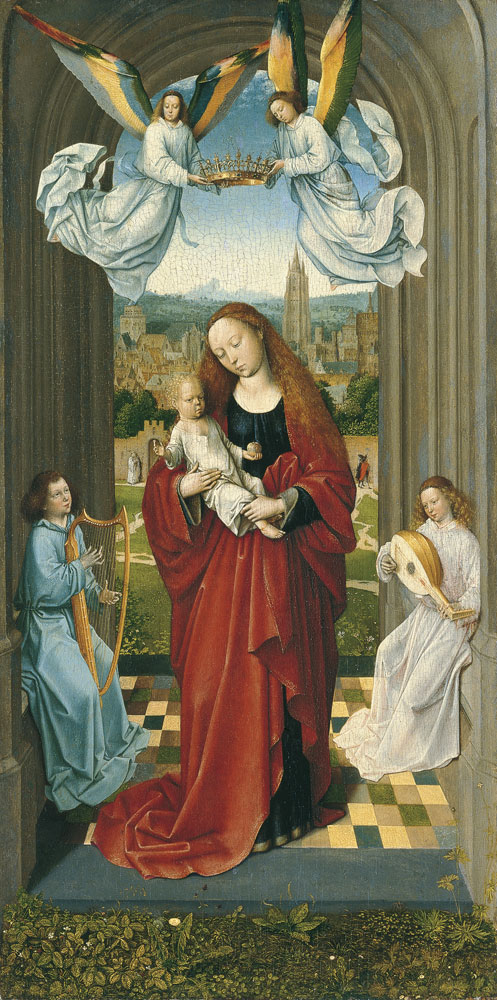
The Virgin and Child between Angels, painting by this master showing a cityscape of Bruges, collection Museo Thyssen-Bornemisza

Master of the André Virgin or Master of the André Madonna (1500 – ?) was a Southern-Netherlandish painter active in Bruges.

Little is known of his/her life. This painter is named after a work in the Musée Jacquemart-André showing a cityscape of Bruges.

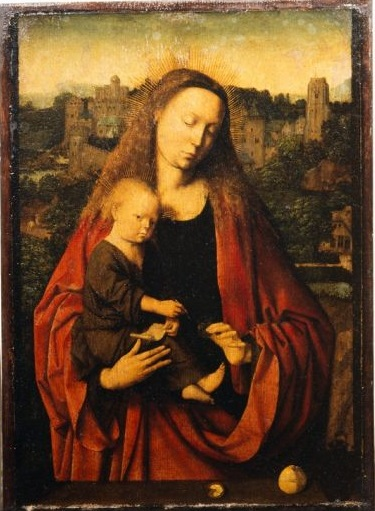
Painting for which this painter is named
