= Master of the Mansi Magdalen =

Early Netherlandish painter

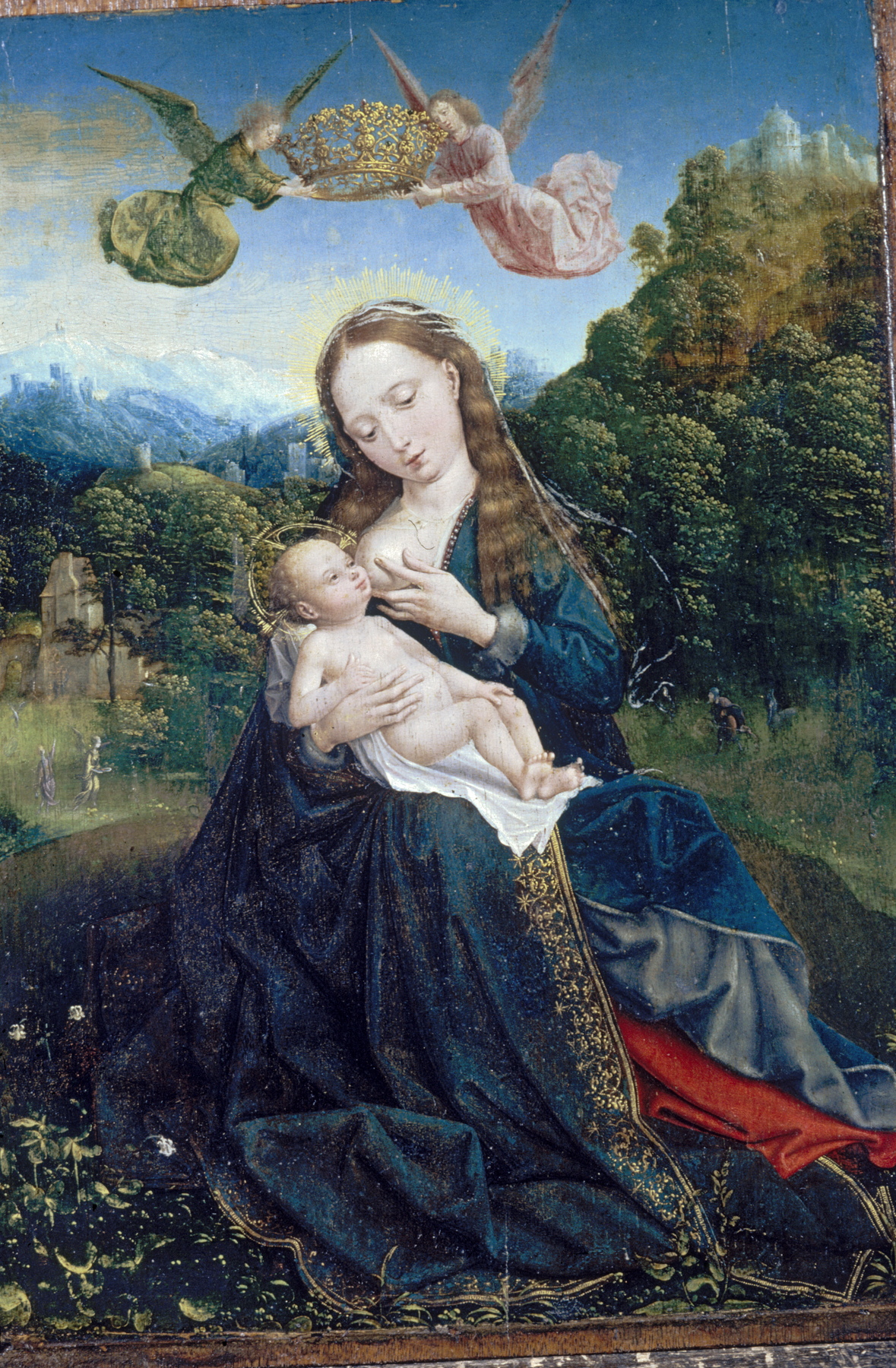
Rest on the Flight into Egypt

The Master of the Mansi Magdalen (c.1490 – 1530), was an Early Netherlandish painter.

== Biography ==
He was active in Antwerp and is possibly the same person as Willem Meulenbroec, an artist registered in 1501 as a pupil of Quentin Matsys.
