= Diptych of an elderly couple =

Painting by Hans Memling

Pendant portraits of an unknown elderly couple, once parts of a diptych
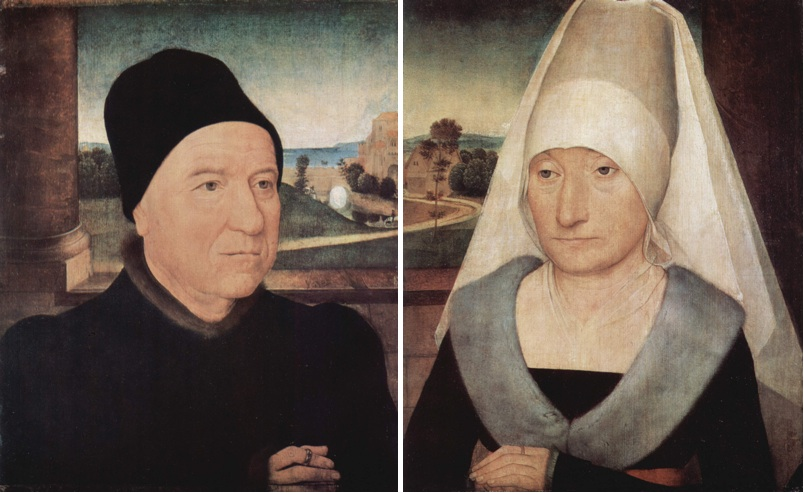
- Artist: Hans Memling
- Year: 1470-1472
- Medium: Oil on panel
- Dimensions: each 35 by 29 centimetres (14 in × 11 in)
- Location: Louvre and Gemäldegalerie (separate ownership)

The Diptych of an elderly couple is a pair of bust-length wedding portraits by Hans Memling, which were formerly attached with pegs and were split some time before they were sold separately in 1894. One is in the collection of the Gemäldegalerie and the other is in the collection of the Louvre. When viewed side by side the landscape background joins up to form a whole.

Nothing is known of the diptych before it was split. The paintings were sold from the collection of F. Meazza of Milan at the sale in April 1894. The Bode Museum purchased the male half, where it was later seen by William Henry James Weale, who included it in his 1901 Memling catalog: Another early portrait is in the Berlin Gallery, the bust of a man about seventy years of age, turned to the left, his hand resting on a parapet. He is clad in a black cloth robe, trimmed with fur, and wears a black cap which partly covers his ear. In the background are meadows and trees; on the left, a castle with a crenelated bridge; a cavalier is watering his horse at the stream, which flows past it into a wide river.

The female half was purchased by Leo Nardus and eventually sold by F. Kleinberger to the Louvre in 1908. Before that, the painting was lent to Weale for his 1902 Bruges exhibition, so he must have seen it soon after publishing his Memling catalog, and he mentions in the exhibition catalog that it is the other half of the Berlin portrait.
