= Master of the Khanenko Adoration =

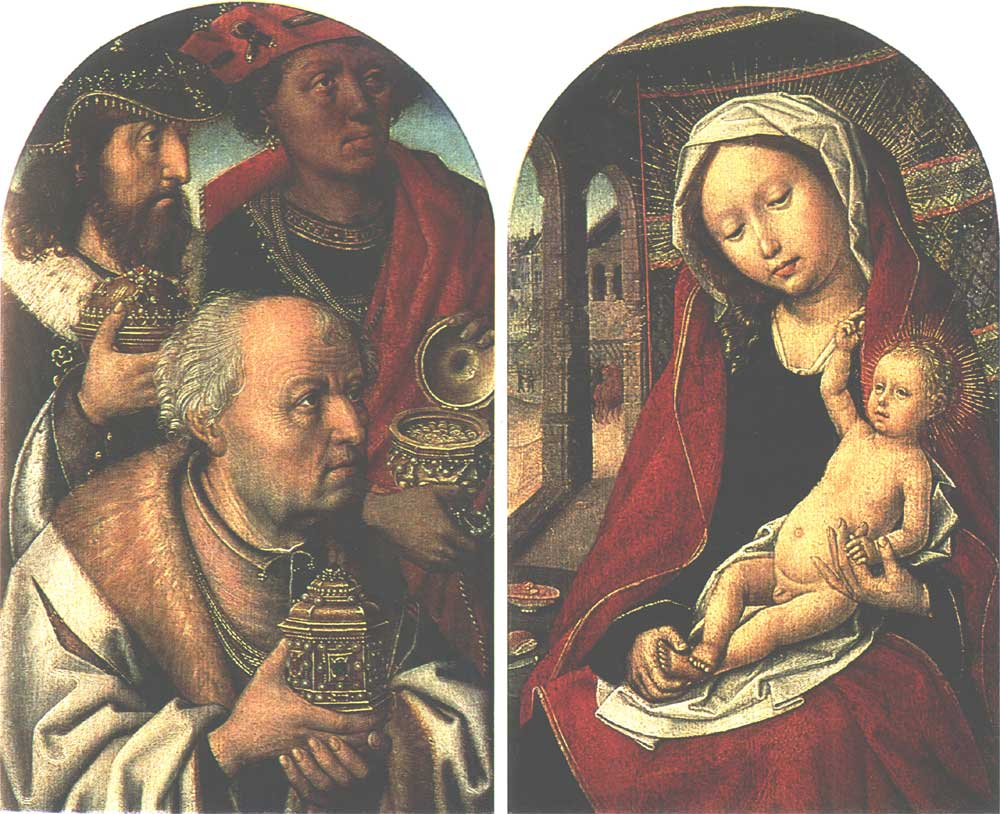
Adoration of the Magi, now in the Museum of Western and Oriental Art

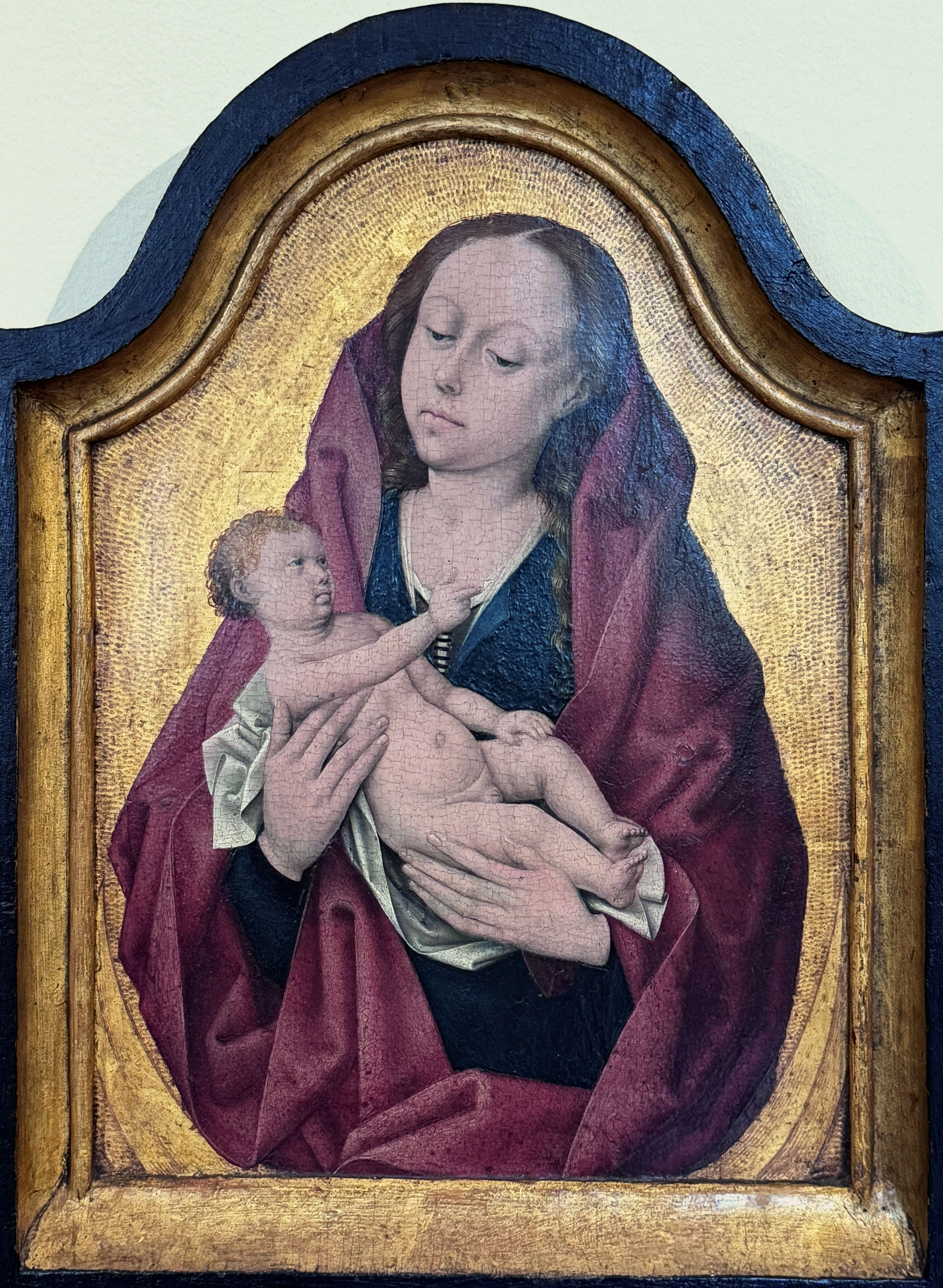
Madonna and Child, Anhaltische Gemäldegalerie Dessau, ca. 1500, 34,5 x 26,5 cm

The Master of the Khanenko Adoration was a Flemish painter active at the end of the fifteenth century. His style is influenced by those of Hugo van der Goes, Hans Memling, and Robert Campin; additionally, echoes of the work of Joachim Patinir and Gerard David may be seen in some of his paintings. His name is derived from an Adoration of the Magi, now in the Museum of Western and Oriental Art in Kyiv, that once belonged to the Khanenko collection. Also ascribed to him are a Madonna and Child in Stuttgart and an Adoration of the Magi in Saint-Omer, although both attributions have been disputed.
