= Georgium =

Coordinates: 51°50′40″N 12°13′51″E

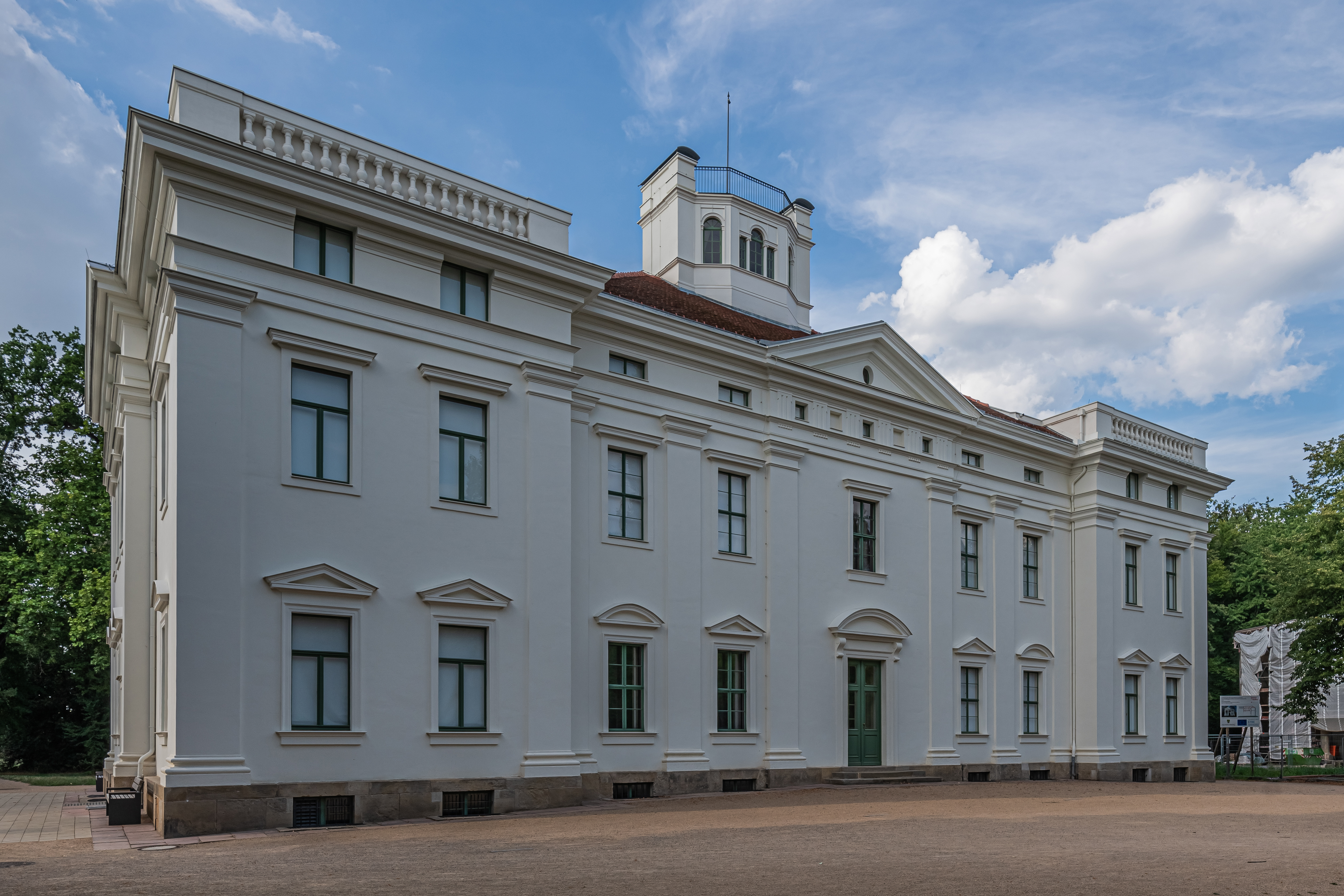
- Interactive map of the Georgium area

General information
- Type: Princely palace
- Location: Dessau, Germany

The Georgium is a princely palace in Dessau, Germany. It was built for Johann Georg von Anhalt-Dessau, younger brother of Leopold III, Duke of Anhalt-Dessau. It now houses the Anhaltische Gemäldegalerie art gallery.

== Garden dreams ==
Georgium Palace, Georgengarten and Beckerbruch on the Elbe are part of the Saxony-Anhalt Garden Dreams project.
