= Moreel Triptych =

1484 painting by Hans Memling

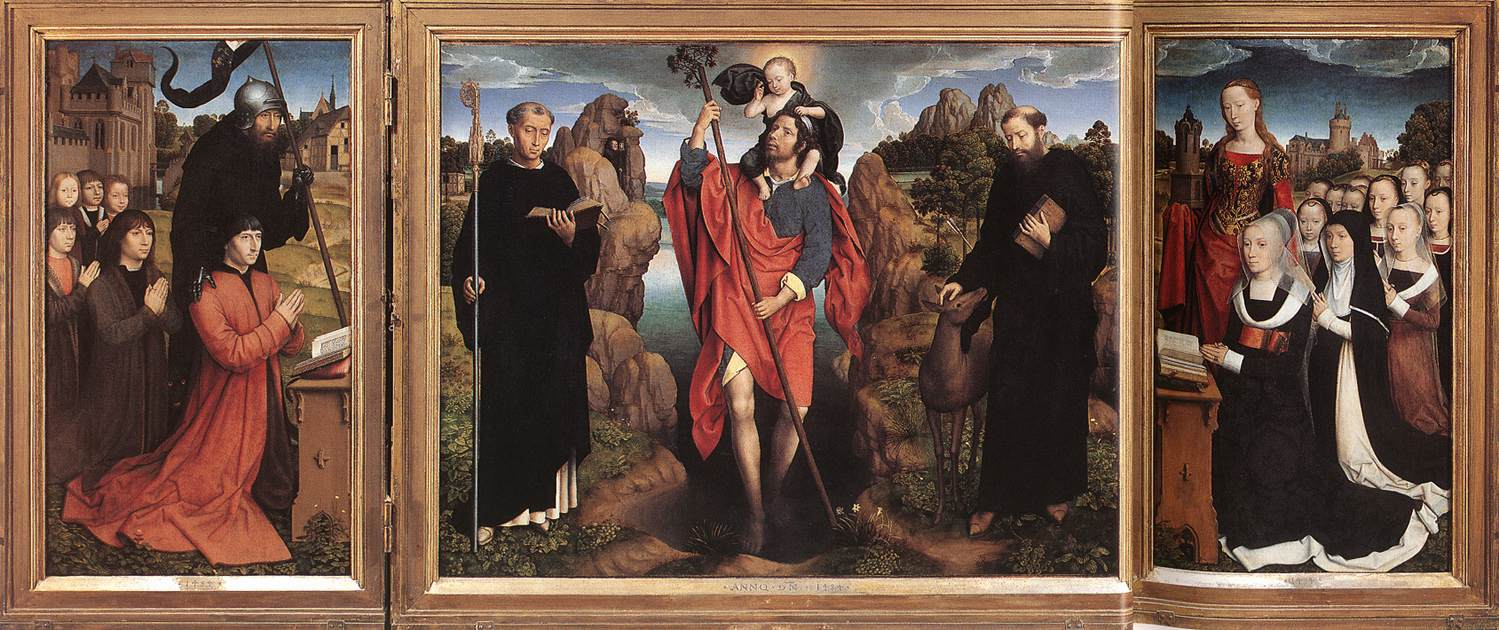
Hans Memling, Moreel Triptych, 1484. Oil-on-wood, 291cm x 121.1cm

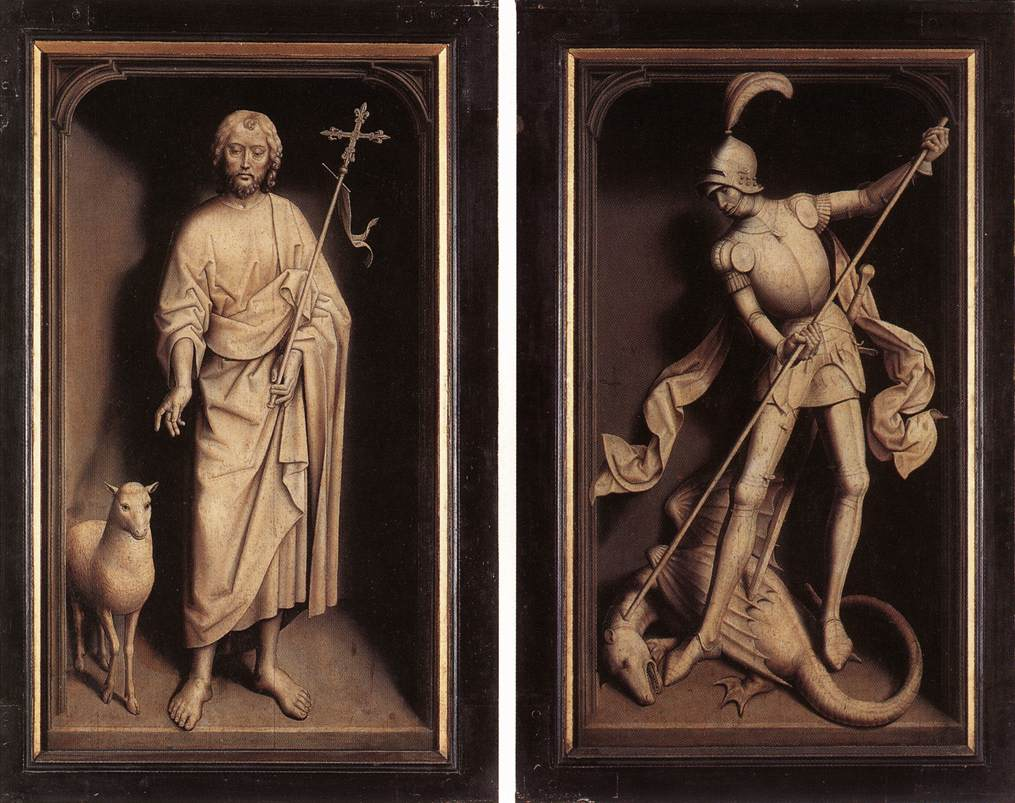
Exterior panels; John the Baptist (left) and Saint George (right)

The Moreel Triptych (or the Saint Christopher Altarpiece) is the name given to a 1484 panel painting by the Early Netherlandish painter Hans Memling (d. 1494). It was commissioned by the prominent Bruges politician, merchant and banker Willem Moreel (d. 1501) and his wife Barbara van Vlaenderberch, née van Hertsvelde (d. 1499). It was intended as their epitaph at the chapel of the St. James's Church, Bruges, an extension they had paid for.

The inner centre panel of the triptych altarpiece shows Saint Christopher holding the Christ Child, with Saint Maurus to his left and Saint Gills to his right. In the left-hand panel, Willem Moreel kneels in prayer and venerates the saints with their five sons. Barbara kneels with eleven of their daughters on the right panel. The exterior panels are probably an early 16th-century addition, completed after the donor's and artist's deaths.

The triptych was installed on the altar of St. James's Church in 1484. It is in its original frames, which are each inscribed with the words anno Domini 1484, or a variant containing the year, on their lower borders. The altarpiece has a strong association with the Benedictine order; three of the figures are Benedictine monks or saints. It is dedicated to Saint Maurus and St Giles, the latter a Benedictine hermit. Today the work is located in the Groeningemuseum in Bruges.

== Commission ==
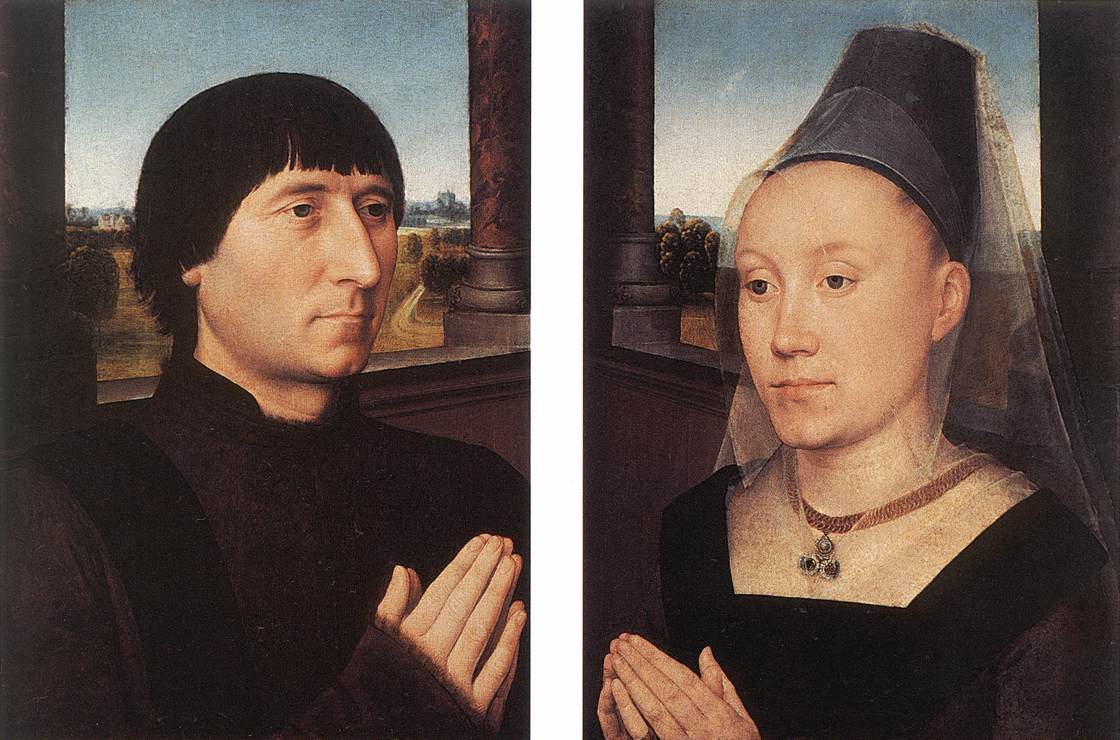
Hans Memling, Portrait of the family Moreel, 1482. Royal Museums of Fine Arts of Belgium

The family of Willem Moreel are known to have lived in Bruges since the 13th century. Willem inherited land and the title "lord of Oostcleyhem" from his father. During his career, he was twice appointed both alderman and burgomaster of the city, as well as its bailiff and later its treasurer. He was named one of the forty richest men in the city in a 1490 tax list. The couple has eighteen children. Memling earlier portrayed the couple in 1482, with a pair of panel portraits now in the Royal Museums of Fine Arts of Belgium.

Saint James's Church was his family's burial ground and was founded in the 12th century. It underwent a major reconstruction in the late 15th century, which Willem Moreel partly financed along with members of the prominent Portinari, Gros and Moor families. The couple intended to be buried in the church building, in a chapel they had paid for and dedicated to saints Gills and Maurus, with space left before the altar as burial space for two people. To the same end, they commissioned the triptych from Memling, then a highly prominent, prestigious and sought-after painter, to be placed on the chapel altar, and only interred in the chapel in 1504, at the request of their son John. Barbara died in 1499, he followed in 1501.

The Moreels did not at first get their wishes as to their burial places. Their standing and political security was hampered by the struggles after the deaths of Charles the Bold in 1477 and Mary of Burgundy in 1482 and the struggle with Maximilian of Austria. Willem was a prominent adversary of Maximilian and was imprisoned in October 1481 for six months. On their deaths, they were each buried on exterior church grounds. They were not moved to their intended resting places in front of the chapel altar until 1504.

== Interior ==
The inner panels share a continuous overcast skyline and broad landscape, which contains two city-scapes, cottages and a meadow with a variety of trees, animals and wild strawberries, daisies, daffodils and other recognisable flowers and plants. Adding to the sense of harmony, both wing panels are identically composed, excepting the number of children. Sixteen of the couple's eighteen children are shown in total. However, some of the figures are later additions, painted over the first layers of oil and pigment.

The figures were identified in the mid-19th century by James H. Weale through their facial characteristics and extant established portraits, through the commonality of Christian names from family names to some of the saints, city records, and through the examination of headstones in the Saint James graveyard.

The inner panels are in relatively good condition for late 15th-century oil paintings but have suffered some damage and paint loss and have been depreciated by ill-advised restorations and touch-up work.

=== Center panel ===
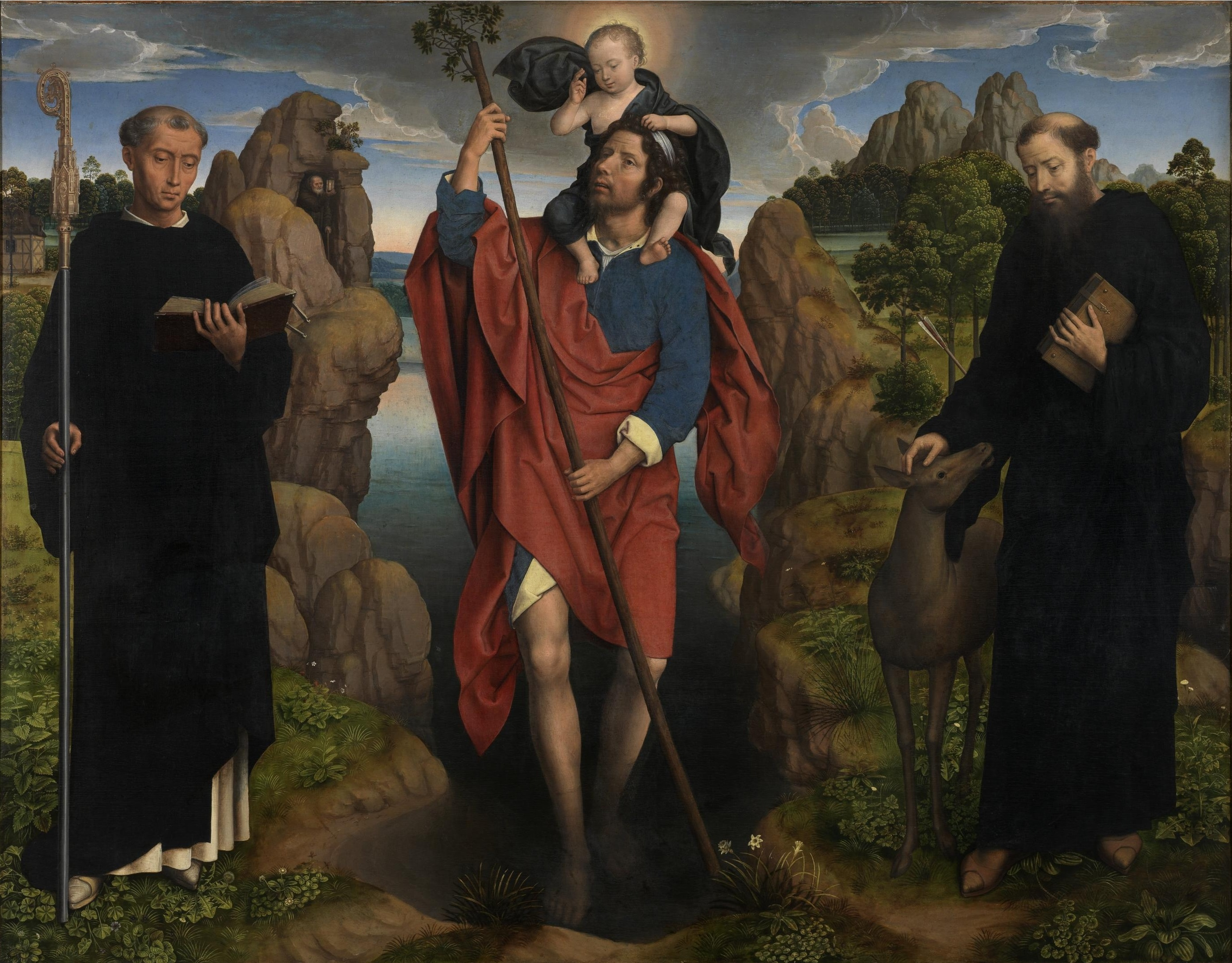
Center panel with Saint Christopher, and Saint Maurus to his left and Saint Giles to the right

The central figure is Saint Christopher, patron saint of travellers, who shares his feast day, July 25, with Saint James, after whom the containing church is named. He is shown standing in water as he crosses a river or inlet, carrying the Child Jesus on his shoulders. He is presented with his attributes, including a large staff, a symbol of Christ's miraculous presence, and is intended as a protector against sudden death. Christopher is dressed in a blue coat, covered with a long red cape folded over his right shoulder. He closely resembles depictions in both Jan van Eyck's Ghent Altarpiece and now lost Saint Christopher, by whom Memling was deeply influenced.

On the left is Saint Maurus, who holds a crosier and looks at an open book. Saint Giles stands to the right, standing with his attributes, an arrow and a doe. Both are dressed in long black robes and are holding books.

=== Left panel ===
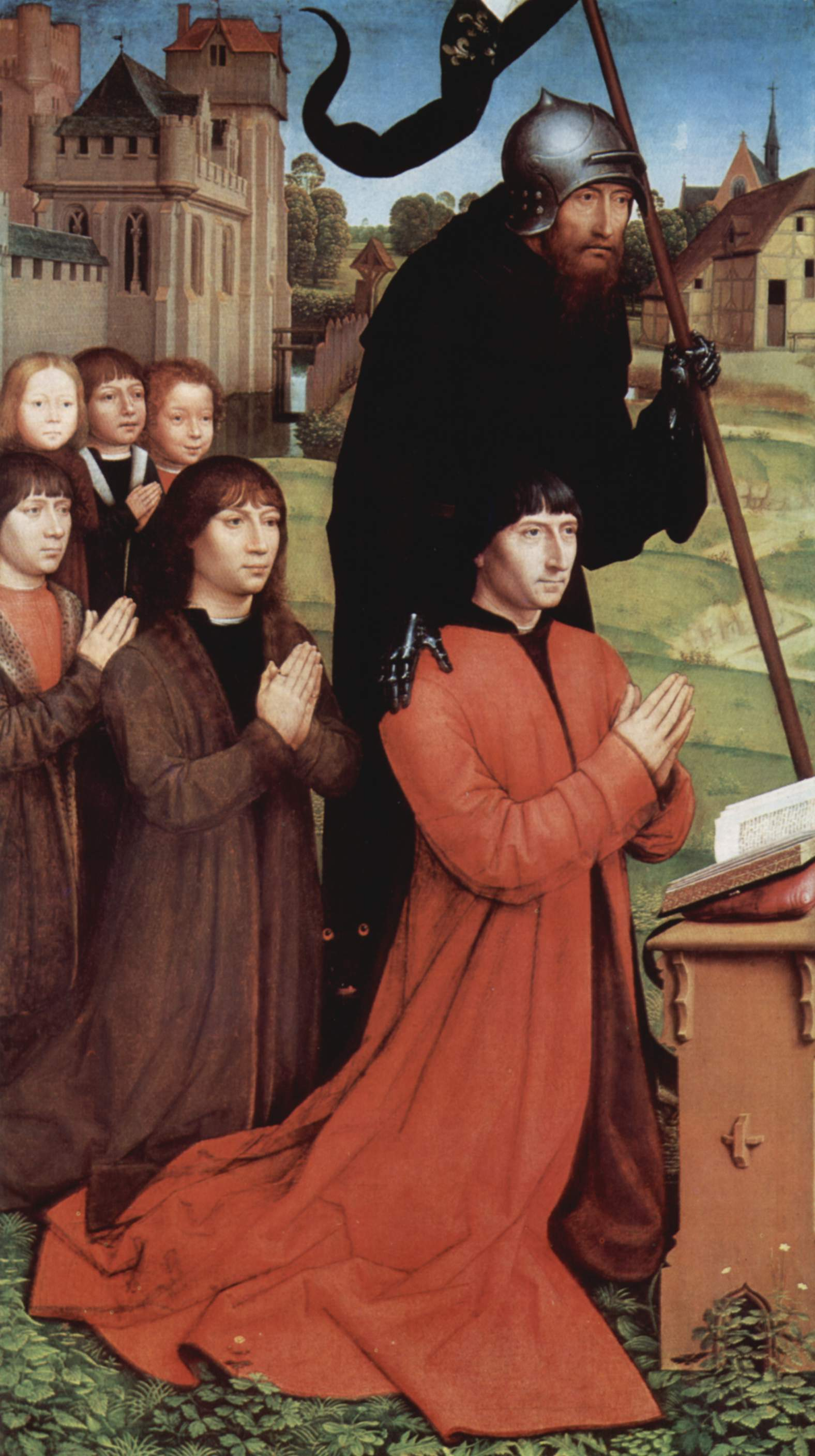
Left panel, with Willem Moreel, sons, and Saint Wilhemus van Maleval

The left interior wing shows Willem Moreel kneeling, his hands clasped in prayer, before an open prayer book. His hair is short in a bowl cut, wears a fur-lined dress and black doublet, a very fashionable outfit in the 1480s. Behind him are his five male children, who are also shown kneeling. Of the sons, two are known to have died in infancy. Willem was the oldest, while John and George are thought to have commissioned the outer panels after their parents' death (see below).

The Moreels are presented by Saint Wilhemus van Maleval, who stands among them, dressed in a fur-lined black coat over army clothing. He places his hand on Willem's shoulder as he guides and presents him to Christopher in the centre panel.

=== Right panel ===
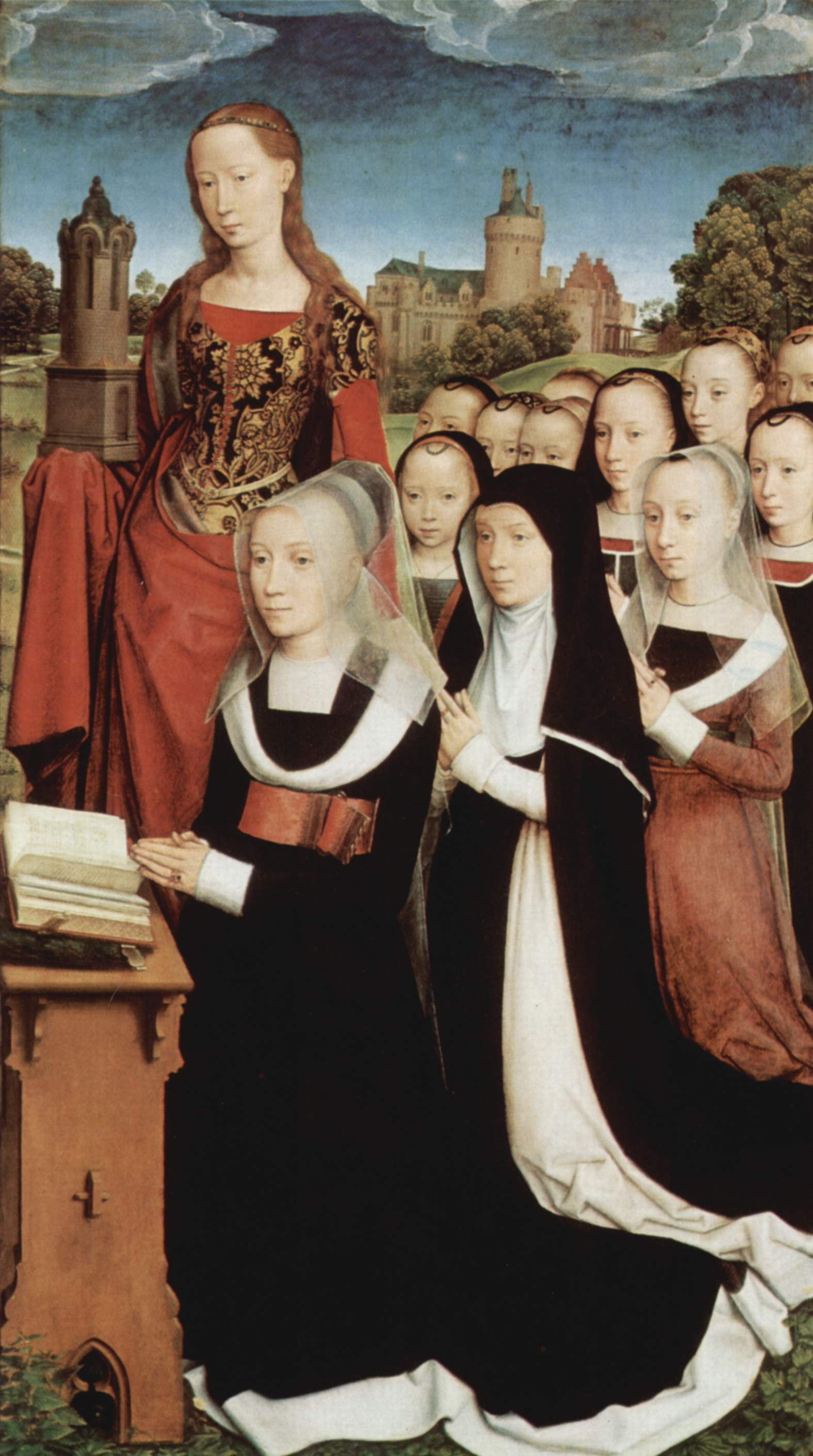
Right panel with Barbara Moreel, daughters, and Saint Barbara

The right interior wing presents Barbara Moreel with eleven of her thirteen daughters, who all also kneel in prayer before an open book. Barbara wears a truncated hennin, a damask silk dress with a white collar, and a wide red belt with a golden buckle. They are presented by Saint Barbara, patron of the donor's wife, who is shown standing before the tower where she was, by legend, imprisoned, which through innovative use of perspective, she seems to hold in her hand.

One of the daughters, Catherine, may have posed for Memling's 1480 Sibylla Sambetha. The eldest daughter, shown directly behind Barbra, and also in a black dress, is known to have become a Dominican nun. The girl in the light brown clothing, black v-neck and transparent veil has been identified as Maria from her name written in her headband, their second-born daughter, given her linear position in the painting. Genealogical research notes that the couple has two daughters named Marie, but it is assumed one died in infancy, and the second was named after her. Efforts to name other of the daughters have been unsuccessful.

Not all of the daughters were painted by Memling; examination by the art historian Dirk De Vos identifies at least six that are later additions layered over the original landscape. Some of these additions can be explained by daughters born after the 1484 completion date and were probably added by members of Memling's workshop. The left-hand panel containing sons underwent a similar update.

== Exterior ==
The outer part of the wings contains grisaille representations of John the Baptist with his lamb and staff (left wing) and Saint George in full armour, slaying the dragon (right wing) with a lance. The panels may have been completed after the deaths of Willem and Barbara, and dated as c 1504 by a number of art historians, probably commissioned by two of their sons, (Note: Shirley Blum considers this "highly likely".) Jan (John) and Jaris (George), as the final, successful, effort to have their parents interred within the chapel space.
