= Sibylla Sambetha =

1480 painting by Hans Memling

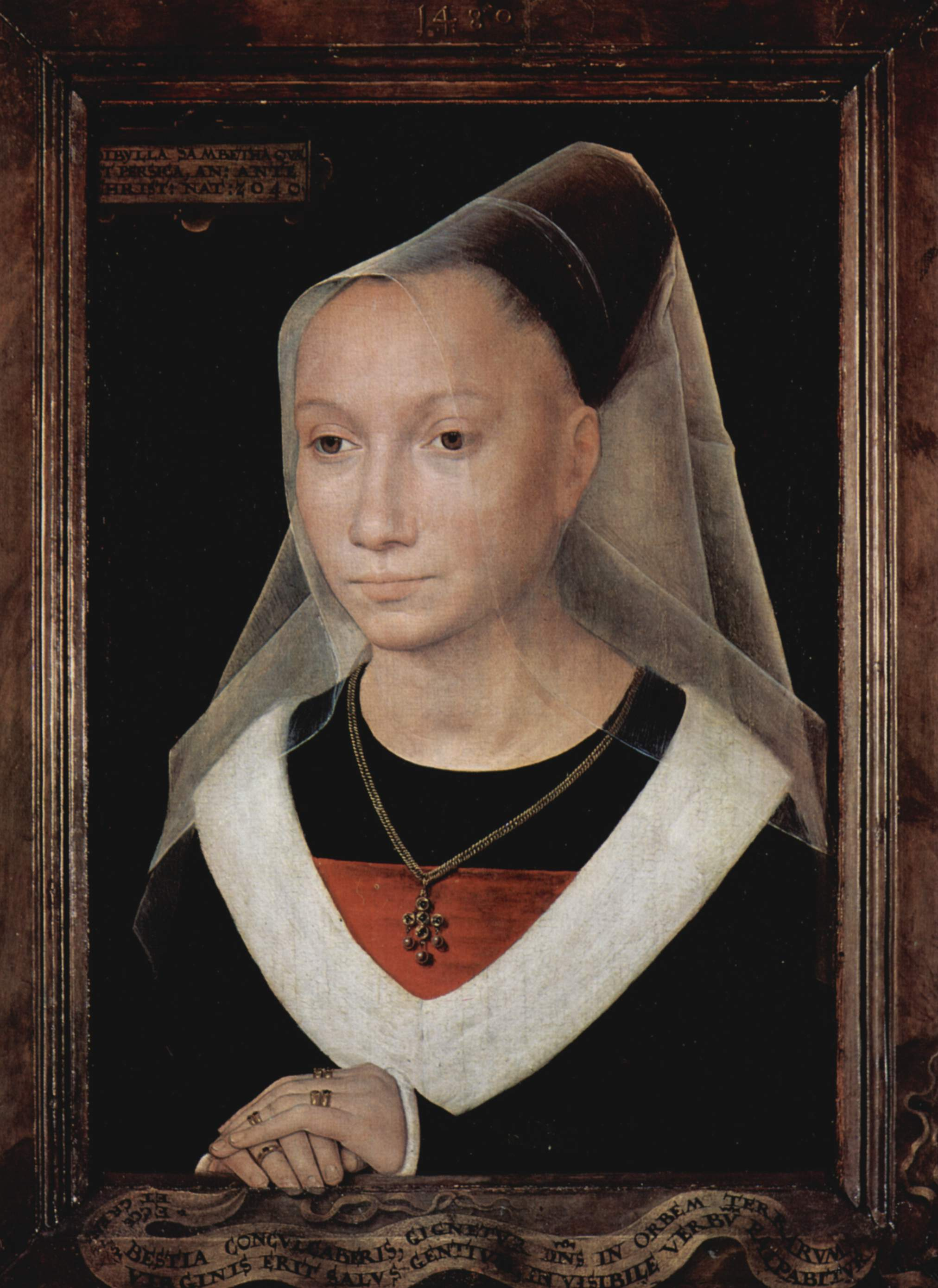
- Sibylla Sambetha
- Artist: Hans Memling
- Year: 1480
- Type: Oil-on-oak painting
- Dimensions: 38.0 cm × 26.5 cm (15.0 in × 10.4 in)
- Accession: O.SJ0174.I

Sibylla Sambetha (the Persian Sibyl, also known simply as Portrait of a Young Woman) is a small oil-on-oak painting by the German-Flemish painter Hans Memling. The inscriptions on the border of the brown marble frame state that it was completed in 1480. However, there is no record of the woman's identity.

The picture shows a young woman who is not pretty but elegant and well-dressed. Her wealth and status are indicated by her hennin, chain and rings. She is set against a flat, black background and looks outwards beyond the pictorial frame, avoiding the viewer's gaze. Her hands are folded while her fingertips rest on the lower border of a painted brown marbled frame, in an early and effective example of trompe-l'œil, a device the art historian Matthias Depoorter described as allowing Memling to "merge the painted space with the real one".

The panel has been in the collection of the Old St. John's Hospital in Bruges since 1815.

== Sitter's identity ==
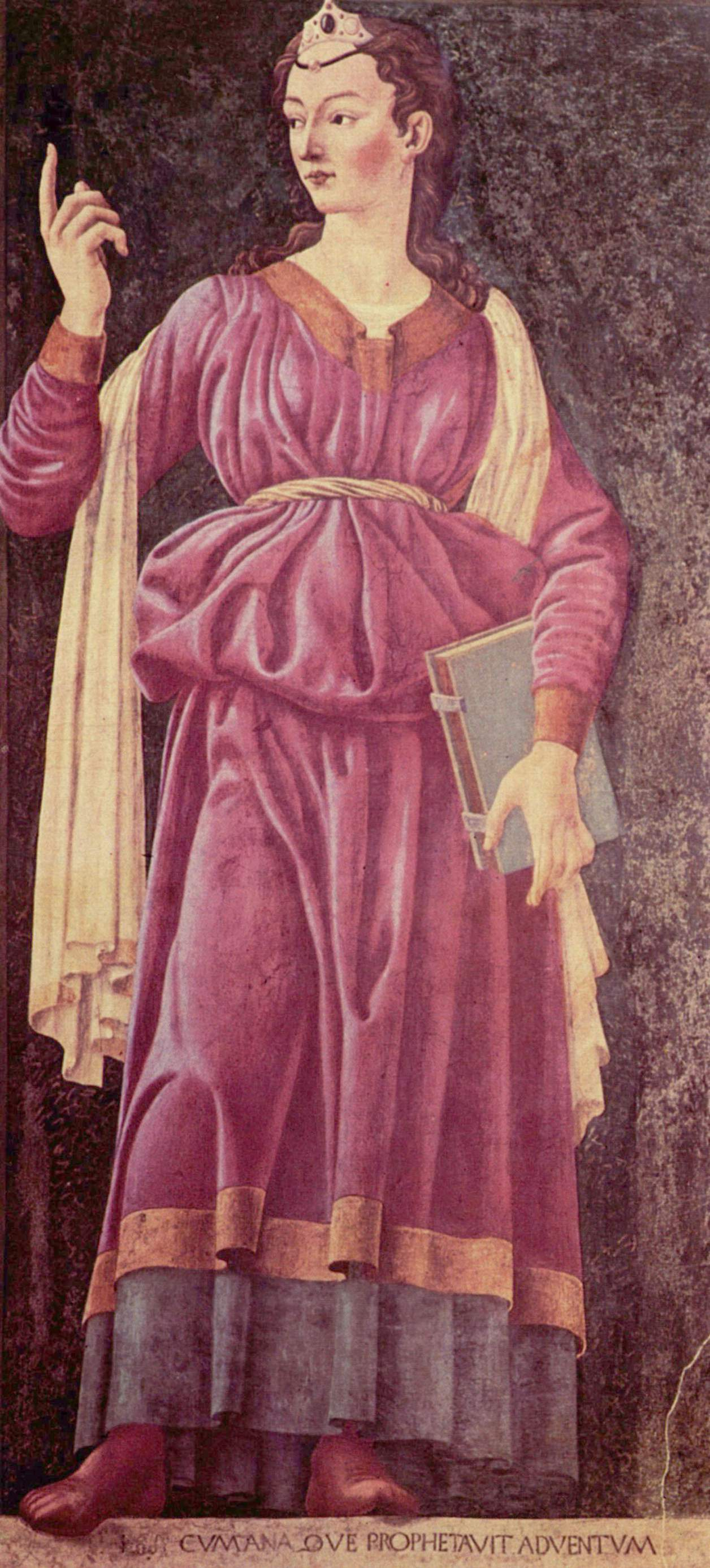
The Cumean Sibyl, fresco by Andrea del Castagno, c. 1450

The word sibyl is Ancient Greek in origin (Σίβυλλα). In pre-Christian classical mythology, Sibyls were originally female oracles and advisors, who were later credited as predictors of the coming of Christ. The original sibyl was called "the Sibylla", and eventually their number grew to ten individual women.

The painted metal cartouche placed at the top left of the panel is a later addition. It contains the words "SIBYLLA SAMBETHA QVAE ET PERSICA, AN: ANTE CHRIST: NAT: 2040" (The Sibyl Sambetha, the Persian, in the year 2040 BC).

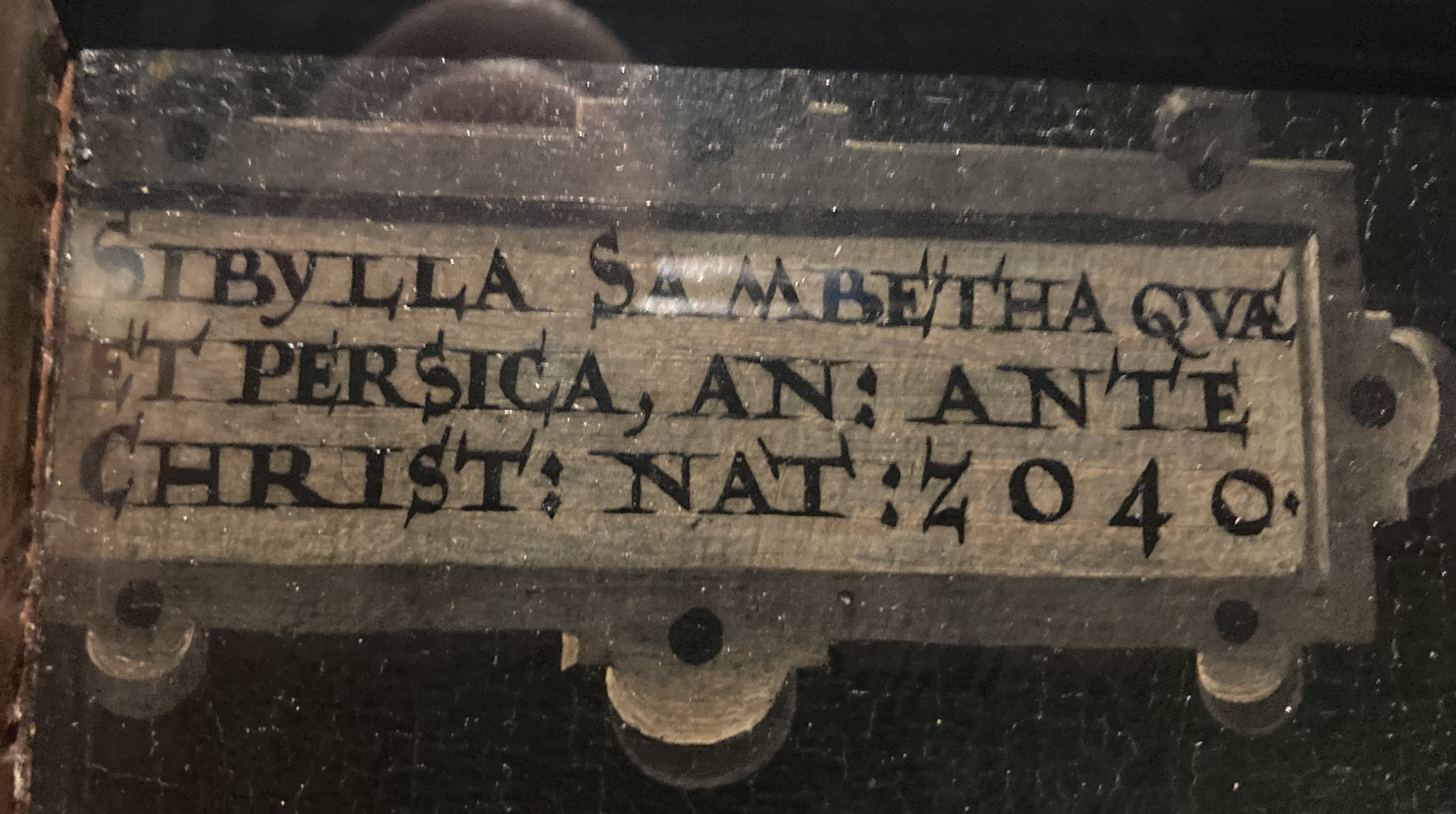
Inscription att the top left of the frame.

The sitter's identity is unknown, although there have been some attempts by art historians to identify her as Willem Moreel's daughter Mary. Willem was a magistrate of Bruges and commissioned Memling to paint both a 1482 portrait diptych and a donor triptych for the Church of Saint James, Bruges, which he had founded. However, this theory is largely discarded as Mary Moreel would have been too young in 1480.

== Description ==
=== Panel ===
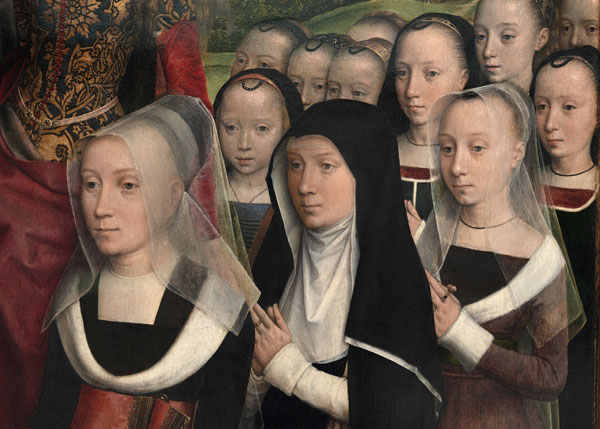
Detail showing the ten Sibylles in Memling's Portrait of Willem Morel and his Wife, 1482. Royal Museums of Fine Arts of Belgium

The panel is 38 cm (15 in) high and 26.5 cm (10.4 in) wide. The sitter wears a truncated hennin under a sheer veil that falls across her face and shoulders. She has pale skin and a fashionably high forehead, with her hair tightly pinned to fit under the headdress. Today her dress is dark purple or black—the colours have darkened from their original blue—with a white collar above a red bodice. She wears a fashionable hennin, a long neck chain and seven rings on her fingers.

=== Inscriptions ===
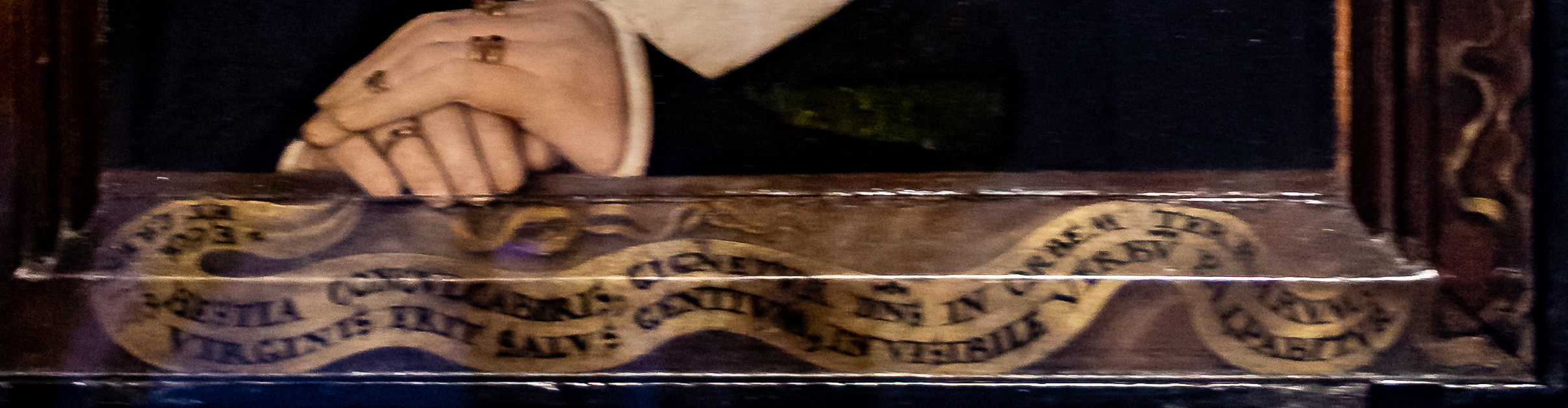
The inscripted banderole at the base of the painting's frame

The scroll at the end of the frame bears another later addition, the text of which refers to Mary with the words ECCE BESTIA CONCVLCABERIS, GIGNETVR D(OMI)NUS IN ORBEM TERRARVM ET CREATUM VIRGINIS ERIT SALVS GENTIVM, INVISIBILE VERBV PALPABITVR (Here let the serpent be trampled under your talon, let the Lord be born in the earthly realm, and the V|irgin's creation will become the world's salvation: the invisible word will be made palpable).

The frame's lower border contains a carved banderole with an inscription reading SIBYLLA SAMBETHA QUAE / EST PERSICA; associating the woman with the Persian Sibyl.

== Sources ==
- Blum, Shirley Neilsen. "Early Netherlandish Triptychs: A Study in Patronage". Speculum, Volume 47, No. 2, April 1972
- Depoorter, Matthias. St John Hospital Museum. Bruges: Ludion, 2018. ISBN 978-9-4918-1956-8
- Eemans, Marc. "Hans Memling". Brusells: Meddens, 1970
- Lobelle-Caluwe, Hilde. "Memlingmuseum Bruges (Musea nostra)". Bruges: Gemeentekrediet, 1987.
- Michiels, Albert. "Hans Memling". Sirrocco-Parkstone International, 2008.
- Reyniers, Jeroen. "The Iconography of Emperor Augustus with the Tiburtine Sibyl in the Low Countries. An Overview". Collection Latomus, volume 366, 2002
- Ridderbos, Bernhard; Van Buren, Anne; Van Veen, Henk. Early Netherlandish Paintings: Rediscovery, Reception and Research. Amsterdam: Amsterdam University Press, 2005. ISBN 0-89236-816-0
