= Portrait of Baudouin de Lannoy =

Painting by Jan van Eyck

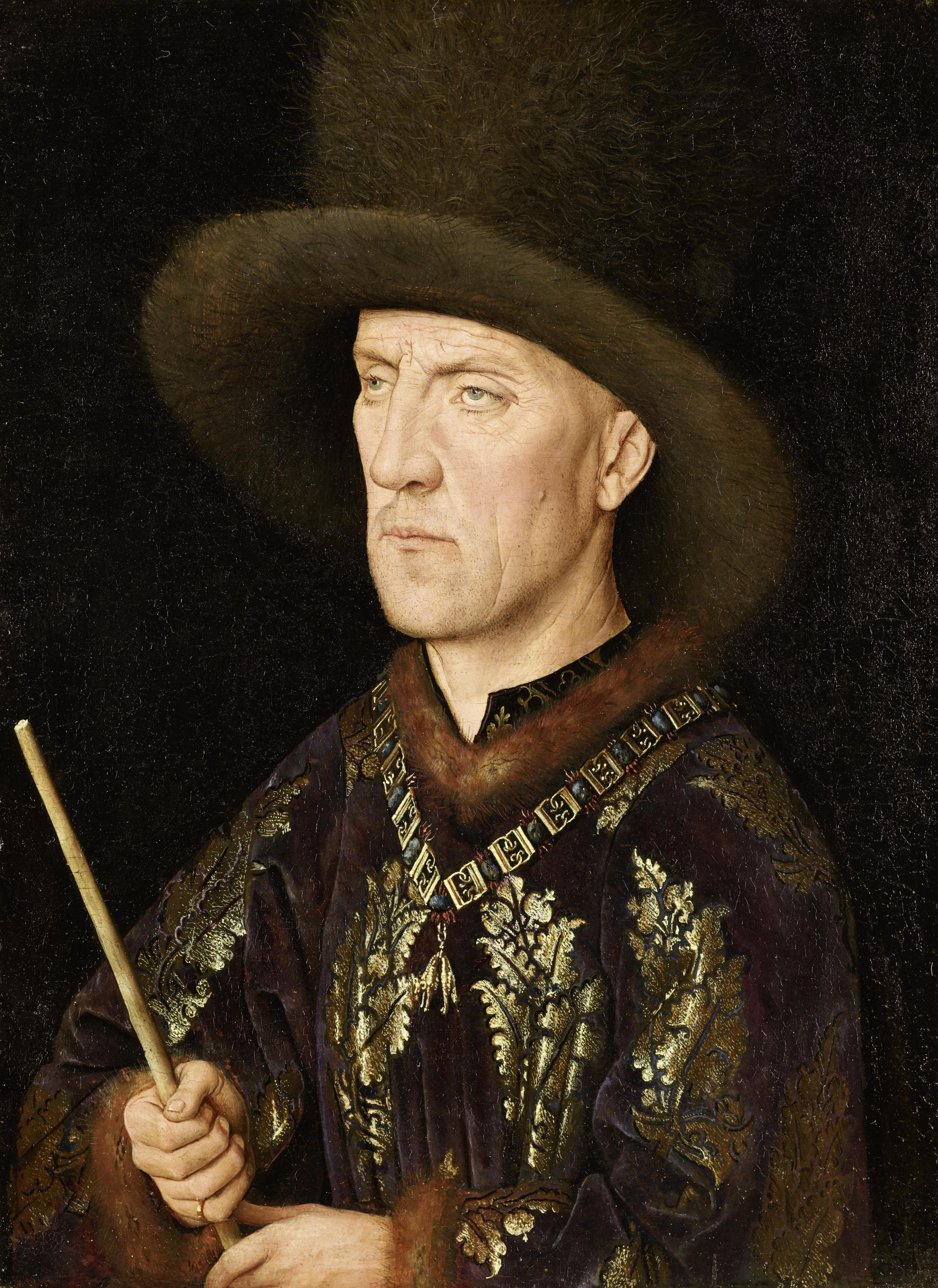
- Artist: Jan van Eyck
- Year: c. 1435
- Medium: oil on oak
- Dimensions: 26 cm × 20 cm (10 in × 7.9 in)
- Location: Gemäldegalerie; Berlin

Portrait of Baudouin de Lannoy is a small oil-on panel portrait by the Early Netherlandish painter Jan van Eyck, completed c. 1435. It shows Baldwin of Lannoy, a contemporary Flemish statesman and ambassador for Philip the Good at the court of Henry V of England. From surviving documents it is known that the work was commissioned to mark his entry into the order Baudouin de Lanno.

The man is shown in a formal pose, holding a wooden stick in his right hand and a gold ring on his little finger. Van Eyck's surviving early portraits typically depict the sitter holding an emblem of their profession and social class.

== Description ==
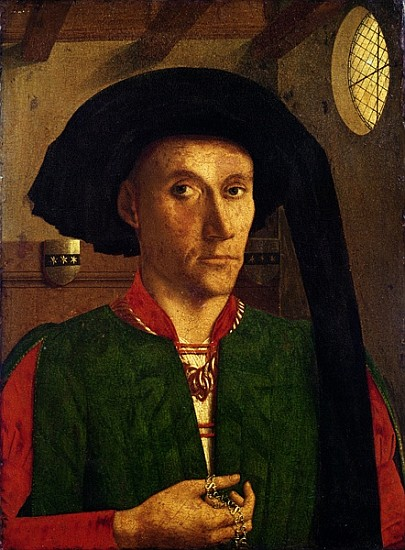
Portrait of Edward Grimston, Petrus Christus, 1446. National Gallery, London. Christus was influenced by van Eyck, and this portrait served a similar function to de Lannoy's, marking his entry to the Order of the Golden Fleece.

The man is dressed in ceremonial robes, with the collar of the Order of the Golden Fleece around his neck. His coat contains dark embroidered motifs in gold, shaped like oak leaves or ferns. The coat contains large strands of red fur lining at the neck and each wrist. His large black felt hat is similar to that worn by Giovanni Arnolfini in van Eyck's Arnolfini Portrait of 1434.

Van Eyck has taken liberties with reality to accentuate the features of his model. In particular, the man's head is out of proportion to his body. However, the artist has done nothing to embellish the portrait, presenting the man as he actually looked, with no hint or trace of the idealisation of the early 15th century.

Its first recorded mention is as part of a collection of portrait copies in the Recueil d'Arras. Today it is housed in the Staatliche Museen zu Berlin, Gemaldegalerie, Berlin. X radiograph analysis dates the growth rings in the wood as between 1205 and 1383, and that the wood was taken from the same tree as the board in his Portrait of Giovanni di Nicolao Arnolfini (1438) and the Philadelphia Saint Francis Receiving the Stigmata (c. 1430-32) usually attributed to van Eyck or his workshop.

== See also ==
- List of works by Jan van Eyck

== Sources ==
- Borchert, Till-Holger. Van Eyck. London: Taschen, 2008. ISBN 3-8228-5687-8
- Campbell, Lorne. "The Authorship of the Recueil d'Arras". Journal of the Warburg and Courtauld Institutes, Vol. 40, 1977. pp. 301–313
- Ferrari, Simone. Van Eyck: Masters of Art. Munich: Prestel, 2013. ISBN 3-7913-4826-4
- Harbison, Craig. Jan van Eyck: The Play of Realism. London: Reaktion Books, 1991. ISBN 0-948462-18-3
- Klein, Peter. Dendrochronological Analyses of the Two Panels of "Saint Francis Receiving the Stigmata". In Rishel, Joseph: Jan Van Eyck's Two Paintings of Saint Francis: Receiving the Stigmata. PA: Philadelphia Museum of Art, 1997. ISBN 0-8763-3115-0
- Upton, Joel Morgan. Petrus Christus: His Place in Fifteenth-Century Flemish painting. University Park, PA: Pennsylvania State University Press, 1989. ISBN 0-271-00672-2
