= Hubert van Eyck =

Early Netherlandish painter (c. 1385 – 1426)

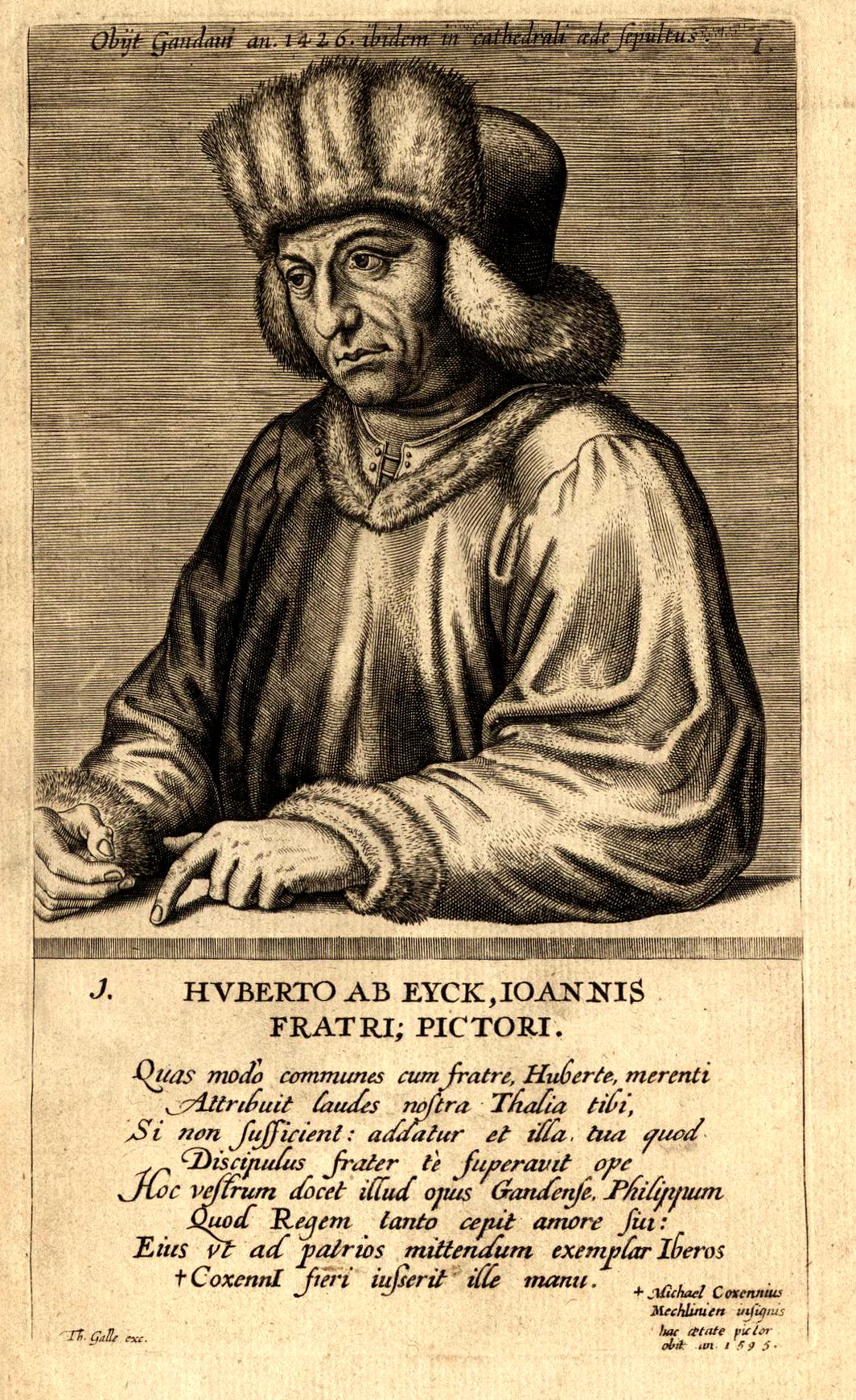
Woodcut portrait of van Eyck, by Edme de Boulonois, mid-16th century.

Hubert (Note: Also found as Huybrecht, Dutch: [ˈɦœybrɛxt].) van Eyck (Dutch pronunciation: [ˈɦybərt fɑn ˈɛik]; c. 1385/90 – 18 September 1426) was an Early Netherlandish painter and older brother of the renowned Jan van Eyck, (Note: Old sources follow Karel van Mander (d. 1606), who gives 1366 as his year of birth, but this is now thought very unlikely. The modern estimate is based on working backward from the documented mentions of him as a "master".) as well as Lambert and Margareta, also painters. The absence of any single work that he can clearly be said to have completed continues to make an assessment of his achievement highly uncertain, although for centuries he had the reputation of being an outstanding founding artist of Early Netherlandish painting.

Today he is attributed to having at least begun the Ghent Altarpiece and The Three Marys at the Tomb, although both were likely completed by his brother Jan.

== Life and career ==
He was probably born in Maaseik, in what is now the Belgian province of Limburg, into a family in the gentry. As the name was not very common, he is probably the "Magister Hubertus, Pictor" recorded as having been paid in 1409 for panels in the church of Onze Lieve Vrouwe, Tongeren. He is probably also Master Hubert who had painted a panel bequeathed in 1413 by Jan de Visch van der Capelle to his daughter, a Benedictine nun near Grevelingen; however he does not appear in guild records, and his heirs did not include any children, so it has been suggested that he may have been in minor orders, perhaps attached to what was then the abbey, now the cathedral, of St Bavo at Ghent, where his Ghent Altarpiece still remains, settling in Ghent by c. 1420.

Around the time of his settlement, or shortly afterward, he began his only surviving documented work, the Ghent Altarpiece in St Bavo's. However, the painting was not finished until six years after his death, in 1432, so the degree to which the surviving altarpiece reflects his work, rather than that of Jan who took it over, remains much discussed. An inscription on the frame, which was destroyed in the beeldenstorm in 1566, stated that Hubert van Eyck "maior quo Nemo repertus" (greater than anyone) started the altarpiece, but that Jan van Eyck – calling himself "arte Secundus" (second-best in the art) – completed it in 1432.

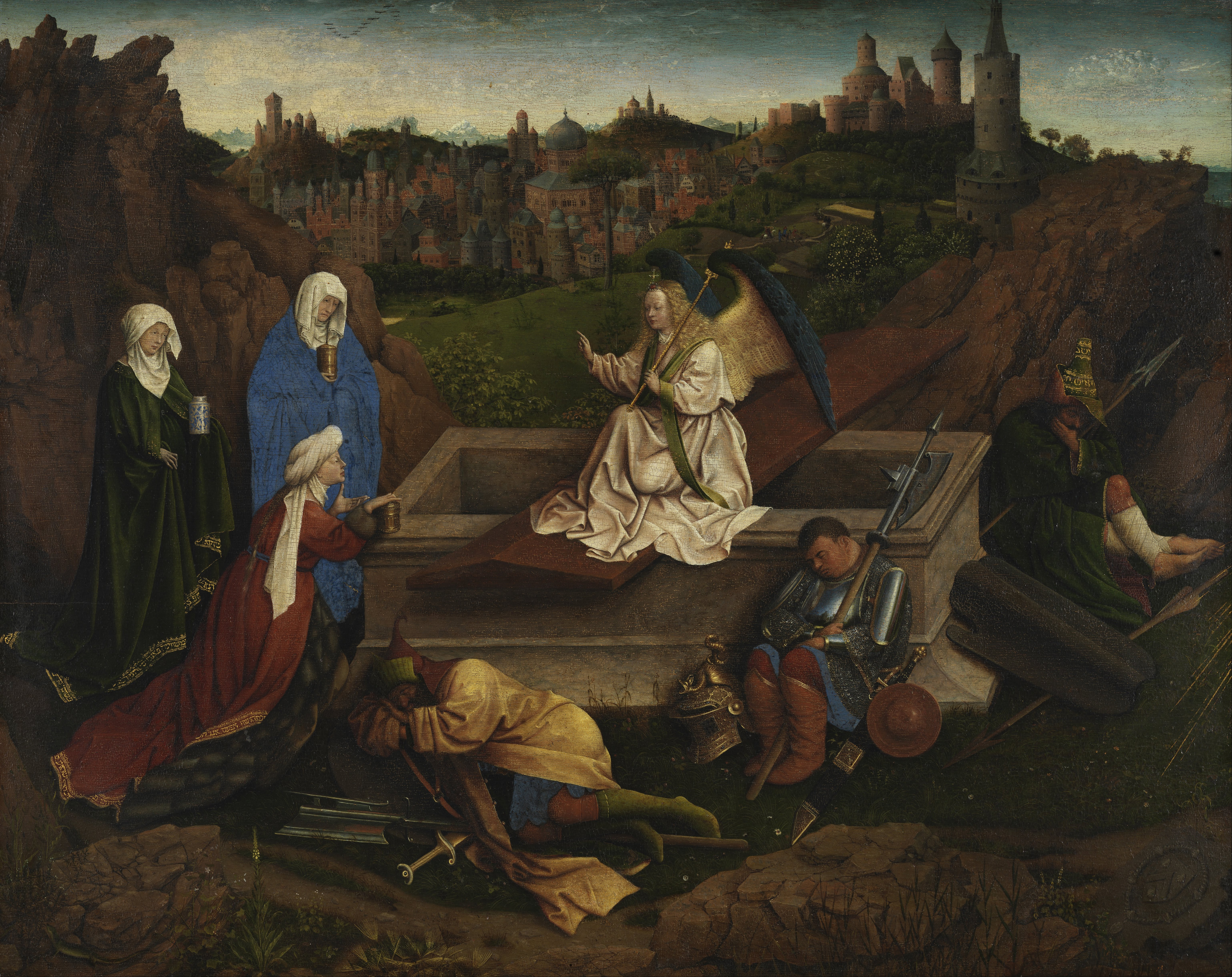
The Three Marys at the Tomb, painted or begun by Hubert, perhaps between 1410 and 1420, and completed by another artist.

Writing in 1933, art historian Bryson Burroughs, who at that time attributed to Hubert the Crucifixion and Last Judgement diptych, describing him as "the fountainhead of northern painting", suggests he did the underdrawing for the Ghent Altarpiece with Jan painting in after his brother's death; some form of this view remains common among specialists. Modern scientific investigation reveals various changes between the finished work and the lower painted levels and the underdrawing. Today the inscription is often regarded as an overgenerous fraternal tribute. Given the circumstances, the Ghent Altarpiece is a difficult work to use for comparison when assessing other attributions, especially as several other artists from the brothers' workshops probably worked on it as well.

The town magistrates of Ghent visited his workshop in 1425; the city had commissioned two designs for a painting from him. He died on or before 18 September 1426, probably still in his thirties, and was buried in Saint Bavo's Cathedral, next to his sister Margareta according to the 16th-century writer van Vaernewijck, who says she was also a painter and unmarried. His heirs paid taxes relating to properties in Ghent. A copper inscription recording his date of death was engraved on the tombstone, but is now missing. According to a tradition from the 16th century, his arm was preserved as a relic in a casket above the portal of Saint Bavo of Ghent. Van Vaernewijck also records the local tradition that Jan van Eyck was trained by his brother, though when Jan is first documented in August 1422 he was already a "master" and working in The Hague.

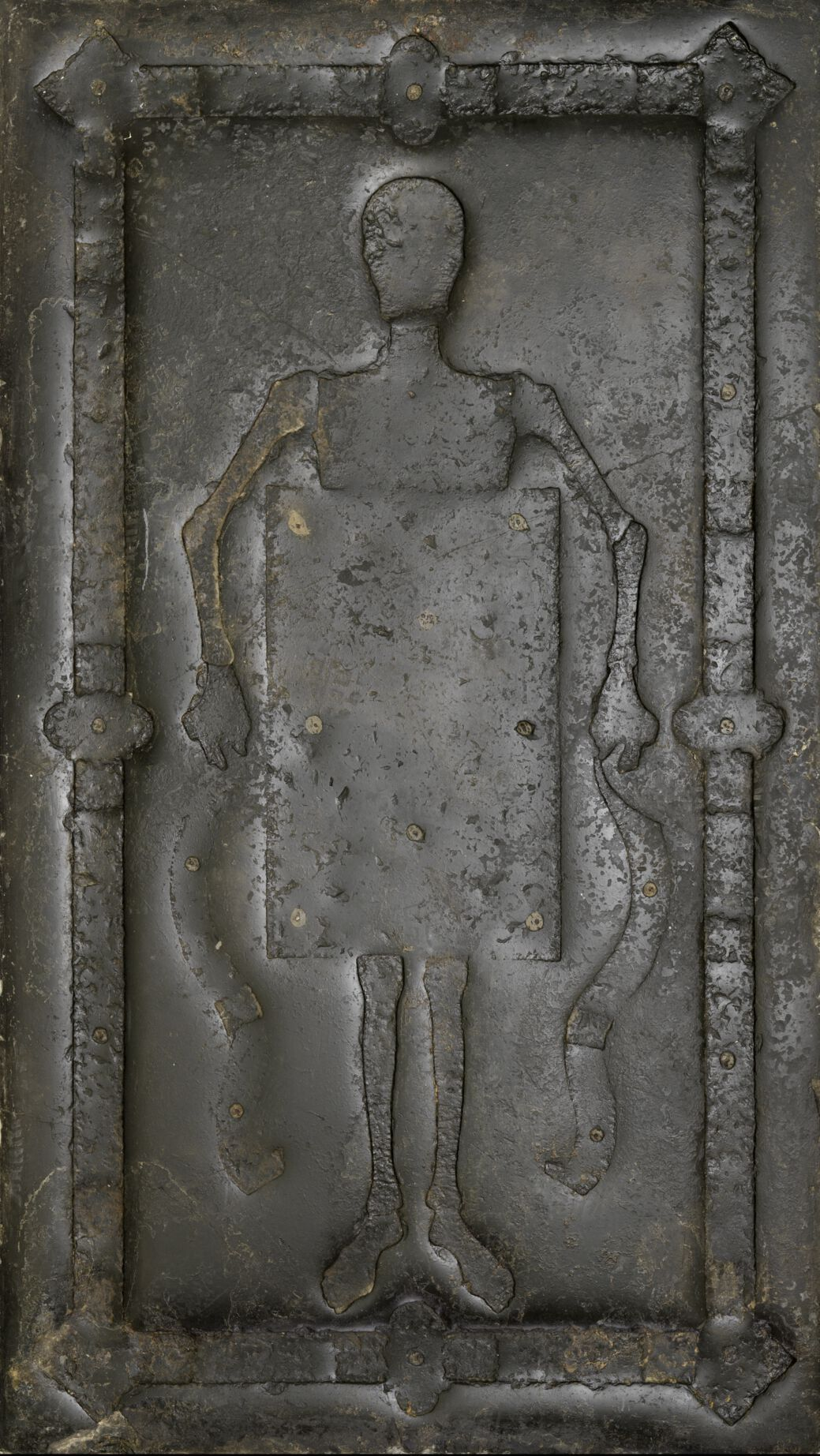
Van Eyck's grave slab in Saint Bavo's Cathedral, Ghent

== Legacy ==
The division of surviving works between Hubert, early Jan van Eyck, and other painters has been the subject of great debate among art historians, involving the Ghent Altarpiece, the many different hands that can be detected in the Turin-Milan Hours, and other pieces. In the 19th and early 20th centuries the inscription on the Ghent Altarpiece was usually taken at face value, and most unsigned works now given to the early years of his brother Jan were attributed to Hubert. After a period in the mid-20th century when there was a strong tendency to attribute work away from Hubert, he has made something of a comeback in recent decades, but there is still a wide range of opinion among specialists. He is likely to have begun The Three Marys at the Tomb now in the Museum Boijmans Van Beuningen in Rotterdam, but this seems to have been finished by another artist some decades later and has suffered from the restoration. Drawings in the Albertina, Vienna of the Apostles have been attributed to him and the British Museum has a drawing copying a lost Capture of Christ that relates to parts of the Ghent Altarpiece.

== Sources ==
- Burroughs, Bryson (November 1933). "A Diptych by Hubert van Eyck". The Metropolitan Museum of Art Bulletin. 28 (11, part 1): 184–193.
- van Buren, Anne Hagopian. "Eyck, van family". Grove Art Online. Oxford University Press – via Oxford Art Online.
- Harbison, Craig (1991). Jan van Eyck, The Play of Realism. London: Reaktion Books. ISBN 0948462183.
- Snyder, James (1985). Northern Renaissance Art. Harry N. Abrams. ISBN 0136235964.
