= The Three Marys at the Tomb (Hubert van Eyck?) =

Painting attributed to Hubert van Eyck

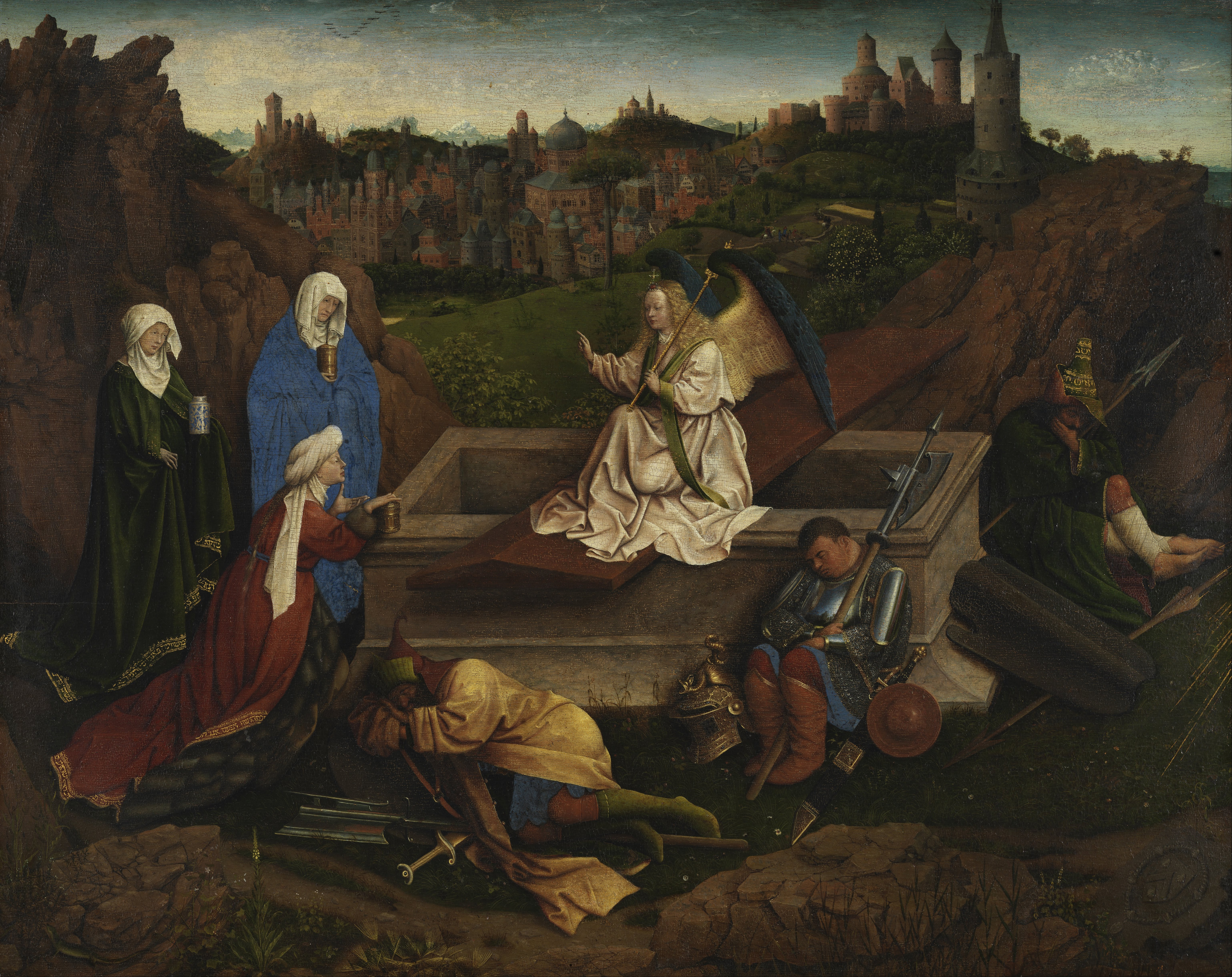
The Three Marys at the Tomb, attributed to Hubert van Eyck, 71.5 cm x 90 cm. c. 1410–20. Museum Boijmans Van Beuningen

The Three Marys at the Tomb is a c. 1410–26 panel painting usually attributed to Hubert van Eyck, now in the Museum Boijmans Van Beuningen, Rotterdam. The painting was included at the seminal Exposition des primitifs flamands à Bruges in 1902.

Its authorship and dating have been particularly difficult to establish. For many years it was ascribed the only surviving work—excepting the Ghent Altarpiece—by Hubert, Jan van Eyck's older brother. Erwin Panofsky believed it a collaboration between the two men (similar to the Ghent Altarpiece); others see it as the c. 1440 output of a member of Jan's workshop, others again solely attribute Jan. Estimates of its date of completion range from 1410 to the year of Hubert's death, 1426.

The painting depicts a scene from the lives of the Markan Three Marys; Mary Jacobi, Mary Magdalene and Mary Salome. They are shown grieving at the site of the entombment of Christ, shown to the left of the tomb, under a hill of jagged rock. To the left are three soldiers, each carrying weapons, and each of whom is asleep. The painting is made up of a series of parallel diagonal lines, most dominant are those between the Virgin and the angel, the angel's pathway, the lengths of the tomb, and the positions of the soldiers. The landscape contains buildings that resembles those in Jerusalem. The sky above the city contains a small passage showing a flock of birds, the earliest depiction in Early Netherlandish painting, although seen again in the "Hermits" panel of the Ghent Altarpiece.

== Sources ==
- De Schryver, Antoine. The Prayer Book of Charles the Bold. J. Paul Getty Museum, 2008. ISBN 0-8923-6943-4
- Ferrari, Simone. Van Eyck: Masters of Art. Munich: Prestel, 2013. ISBN 3-7913-4826-4
- Nauert, Charles G. The A to Z of the Renaissance. Scarecrow Press, 2013.
