= Saint Christopher (after van Eyck) =

Painting by an unknown follower of Jan van Eyck

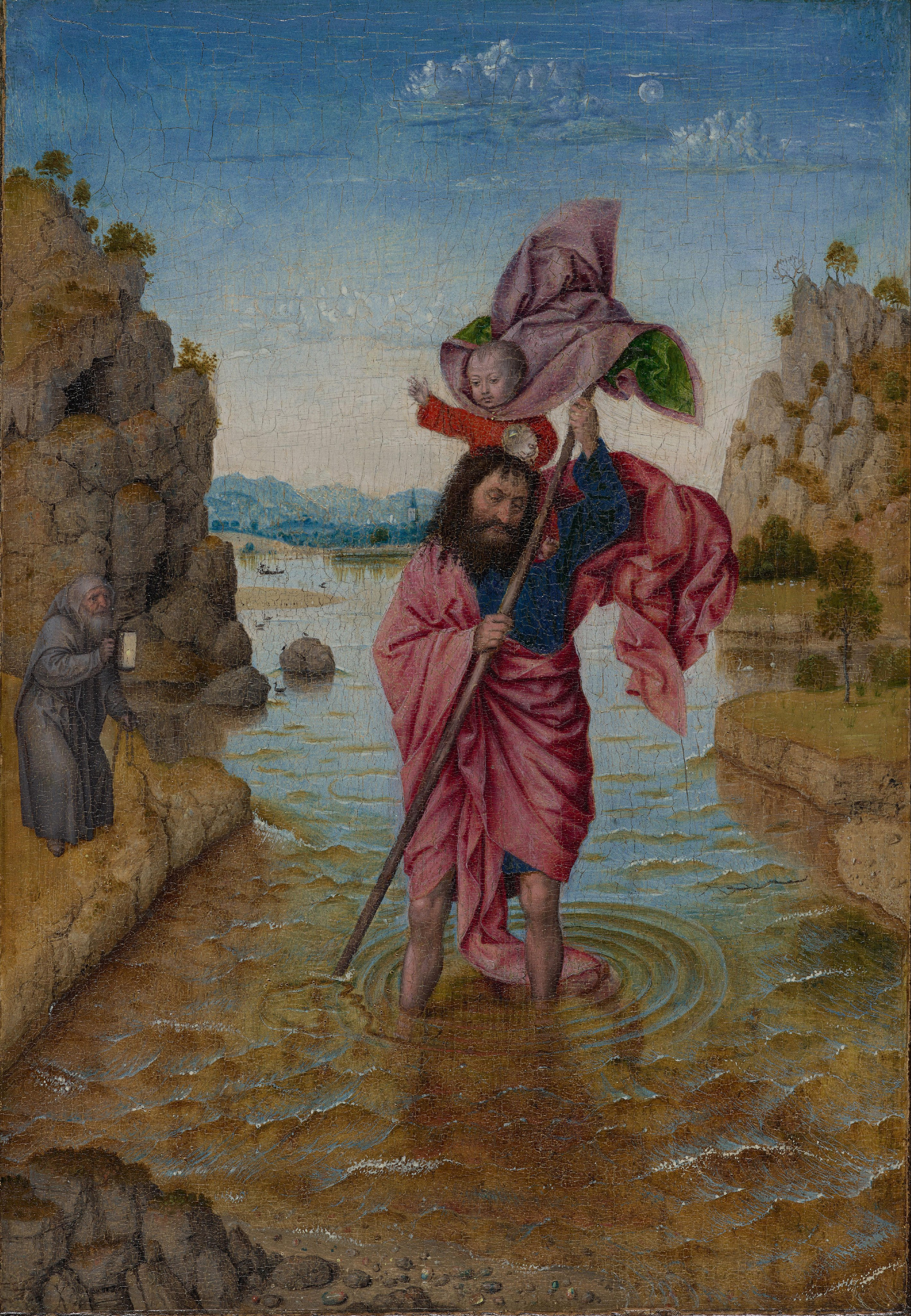
Philadelphia Museum of Art. Oil on panel, 29.5cm x 21.1cm

Saint Christopher is a lost painting by Jan van Eyck. The painting is mainly recorded through a 1460–1470 copy on oil on oak panel, in the Philadelphia Museum of Art since 1917, and a c 1480 drawing at the Musee du Louvre. The c 1460–1470 copy is by an unknown follower. Each show a giant, bearded man, wading through water with a large stick, carrying the infant Christ on his shoulders. The implication is that Saint Christopher, patron saint of travelers, carries the weight of the world on his back; The works show him leaning on a large stick as Christ holds a globe, with arms raised in blessing, his robe billowing to the right. The pair are set in a highly detailed, richly coloured and atmospheric landscape. There are jagged rocks on either side, set against an early evening sky, with star formations.

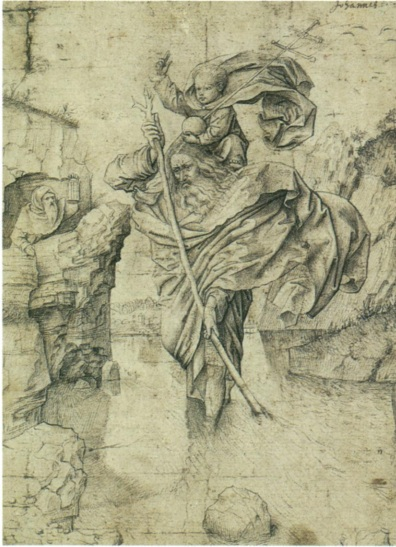
Saint Christopher, follower of van Eyck, Louvre

The painting was hugely influential and widely copied. It is directly referenced in a wing of Dieric Bouts Munich Adoration of the Maji, and Hans Memling's Moreel Triptych.

The Philadelphia copy, through dendrochronological analysis, is placed as around 1460, and probably closely follows the colourisation of the original. However it omits a lot of detail found in the drawing, which is considered superior.

== Sources ==
- Borchert, Till-Holger. Van Eyck to Durer: The Influence of Early Netherlandish painting on European Art, 1430–1530. London: Thames & Hudson, 2011. ISBN 978-0-500-23883-7
