= St. James's Church, Bruges =

Church in Bruges, Belgium

Coordinates: 51.2106°N 3.2207°E

St. James's Church (Dutch: Sint-Jakobskerk) is a Catholic church in Bruges, Belgium. Originally built around 1240, the church was considerably expanded in 1459 to match the rising affluence of Bruges, and was patronized by the Duke of Burgundy. In the late 17th and early 18th centuries, the church's interior was remodeled in its present Baroque style.

The church is sometimes wrongly called St. Jacob's. The confusion arises because Flemish, like many other languages, uses the same word for both James and Jacob.

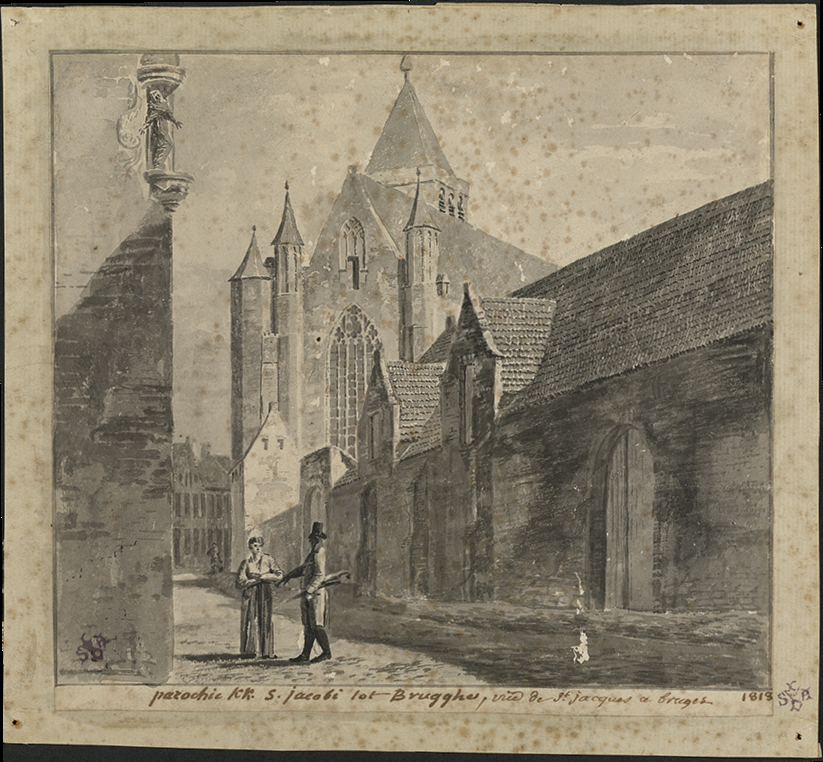
St. James's Church, drawing by Séraphin Vermote, 1813 (Groeningemuseum)

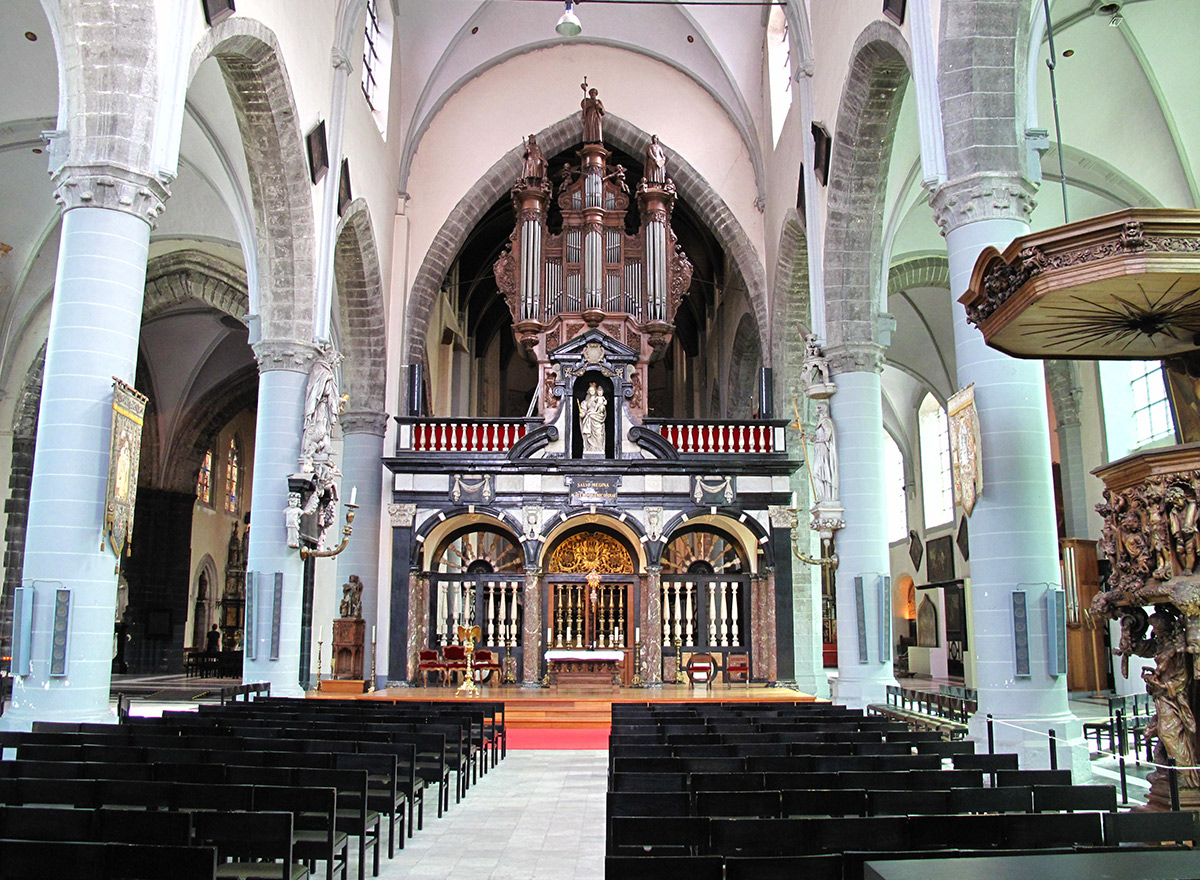
St. James's interior
