= Cornelia Cnoop =

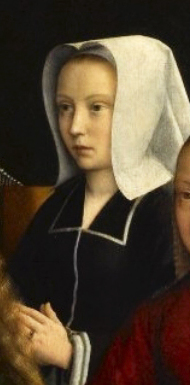
- Portrait of Cornelia as donor in Virgin among the Virgins (Virgo inter Virgines) (1509), by her husband Gerard David.
- Born: 1450
- Died: Unknown

Cornelia Cnoop or Cnopp (born 1450) was a Netherlandish miniature painter. A painting attributed to her hand was exhibited in 1902 in Bruges during the Exposition des primitifs flamands à Bruges, in the Provinciaal Hof as catalog number 130.

She was married to the painter and manuscript illuminator Gerard David.

She was born in Bruges as the daughter of the goldsmith Jacob Cnoop de Jongere and Kathelijne uter Vorst. Her father was a dean of the goldsmiths' guild. She married Gerard David in 1497. They had a daughter Barbara. In 1509 her husband donated a Virgo inter Virgines to the church of the Carmelites, that included a self-portrait on the left and a portrait of his wife on the right.
