= Master of the Plump-Cheeked Madonnas =

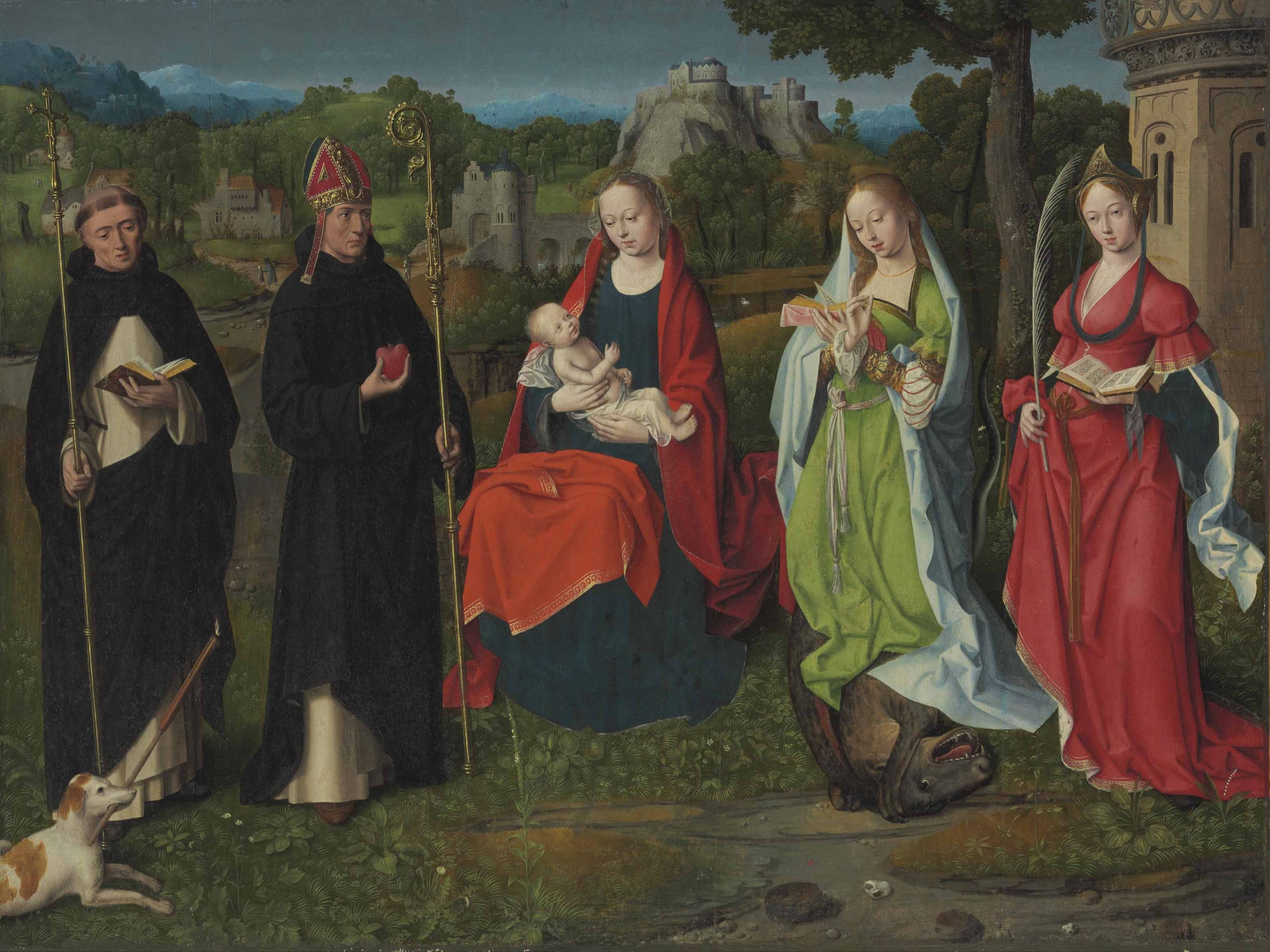
Virgin and Child with Saints Dominic, Augustine, Margaret and Barbara

The Master of the Plump-Cheeked Madonnas (fl. between 1500 and 1525) is the notname given to a Flemish painter who likely worked in Bruges in the first quarter of the 16th century. He produced devotional pictures in a style reminiscent of contemporary painters working in Bruges such as Gerard David and Ambrosius Benson.

== Identification of the oeuvre ==
In an article published in 2000, the Belgian art historian Didier Martens grouped eight paintings together under the notname Master of the Plump-Cheeked Madonnas. The key work around which he built the identification was the Virgin and Child with Saints Dominic, Augustine, Margaret and Barbara (at that time in the collection of the Metropolitan Museum and since auctioned by Christie's on 29 January 2014, New York, lot 105).

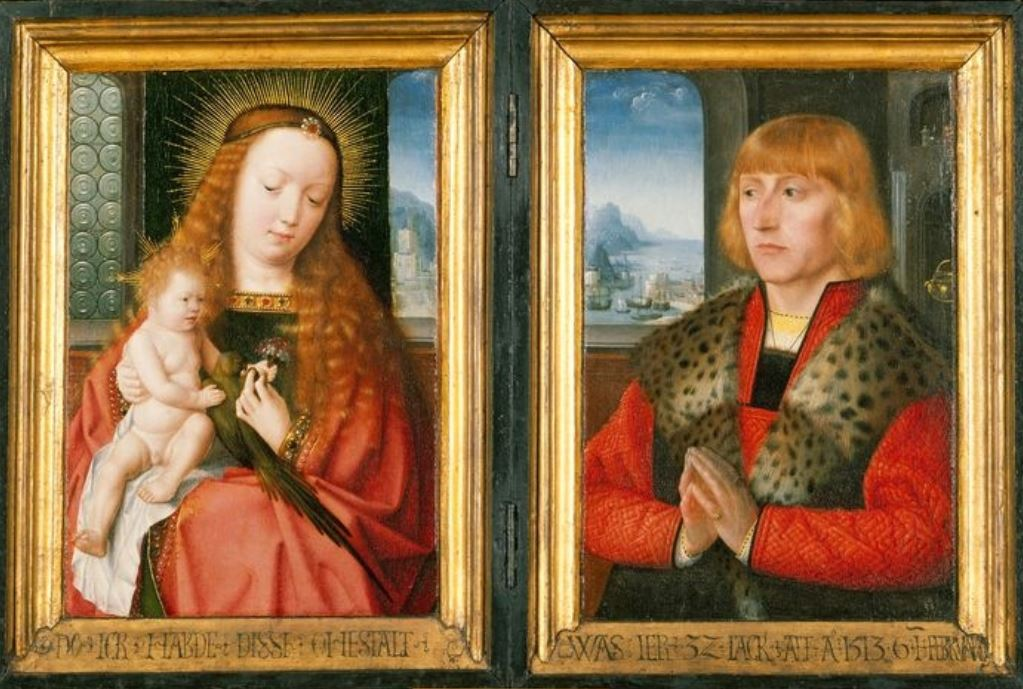
Madonna and Child with a Member of the Hillensberger Family

On stylistic grounds Didier Martens attributed the works to an anonymous painter believed to have been active in Bruges during the first half of the 16th century. All of the works contain female figures which are characterised by their rounded, full faces. It is this key feature that gave rise to the naming of the artist as the 'Master of the Plump-Cheeked Madonnas'. In particular, the faces of the female figures in these works show a strong resemblance to each other: the forehead is high and clear, the eyes are half-closed, the eyelids are fat, the eyebrows are fine and curved, the nose ends on a straight edge and the nostrils are narrow. Stylistically the paintings are close to the mature work of other Bruges painters such as Gerard David and Ambrosius Benson.

Whereas the artist was likely active in Bruges as is evidenced by the clear influence of the Bruges style on his work it does not necessarily mean that he was a native of Bruges.

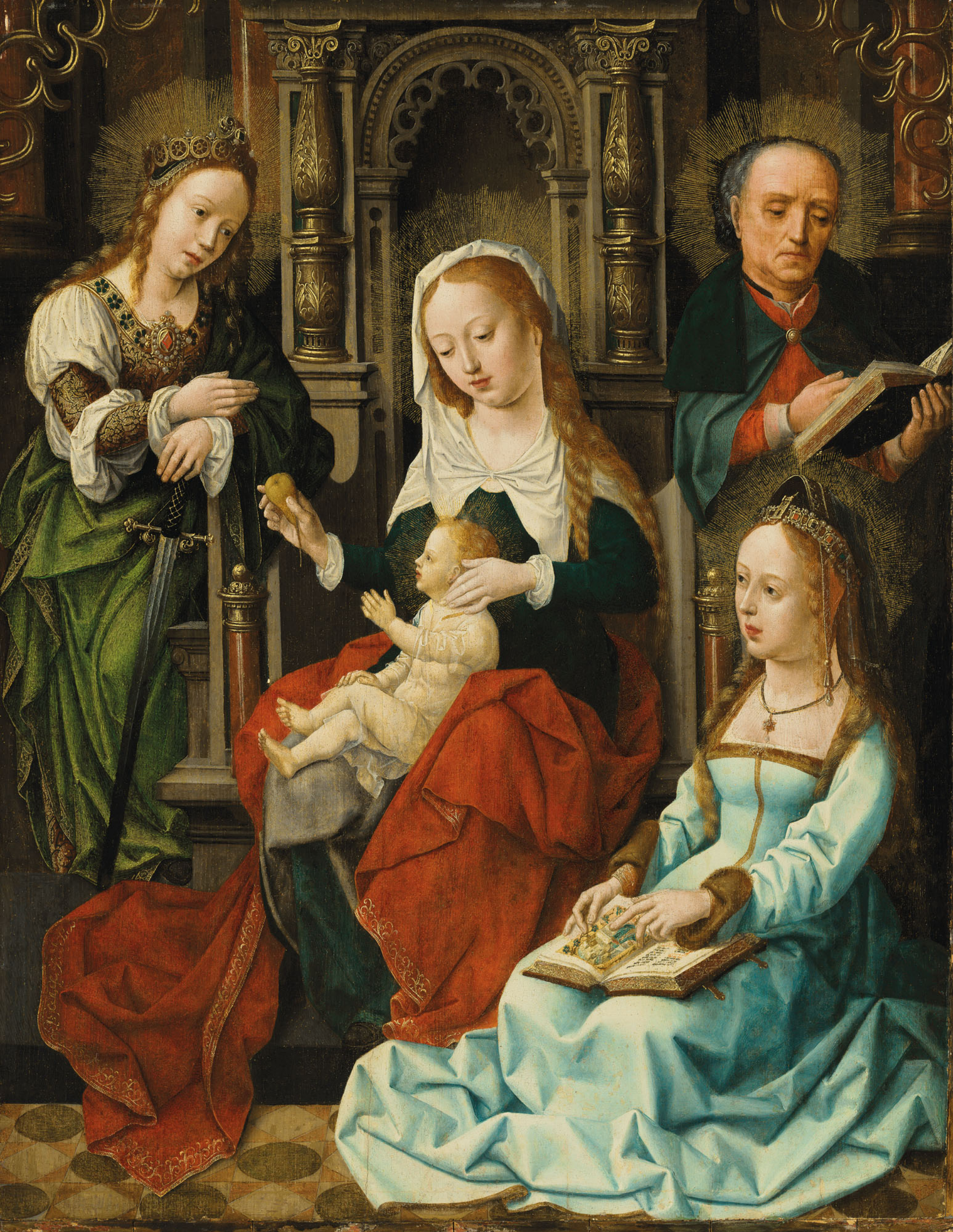
Holy Family with Saints Catherine and Barbara

== Works ==
About a dozen works are now attributed to the Master. The subject matter of the works attributed to the Master are devotional in nature and most of them depict scenes with the Virgin and Child, the Holy family and the so-called sacra conversazione, i.e. the Virgin and Child amidst a group of saints in a relatively informal grouping. A few portraits by his hand have also been preserved. These works likely portrayed the donors who had paid for the devotional work of which the portraits had formed the pendants.

== Selected works ==
The works attributed to the Master of the Plump-Cheeked Madonnas include:

- Virgin and Child with Saints Dominic, Augustine, Margaret and Barbara, formerly in the collection of the Metropolitan Museum and since auctioned by Christie's on 29 January 2014, New York, lot 105
- Virgin and Child with Saint Joseph and an Angel, Musée de l'hôtel Sandelin
- Virgin and Child, Groeningemuseum
- Virgin giving milk, Museum of Fine Arts of Lyon
- Madonna and Child with a Member of the Hillensberger Family, Lowe Art Museum
- Virgin and Child, Museo Nacional de San Carlos
- Virgin and Child, formerly in the collection of the marqués de Santo Domingo
