= Adoration of the Shepherds (David) =

Painting by Gerard David

The Adoration of the Shepherds
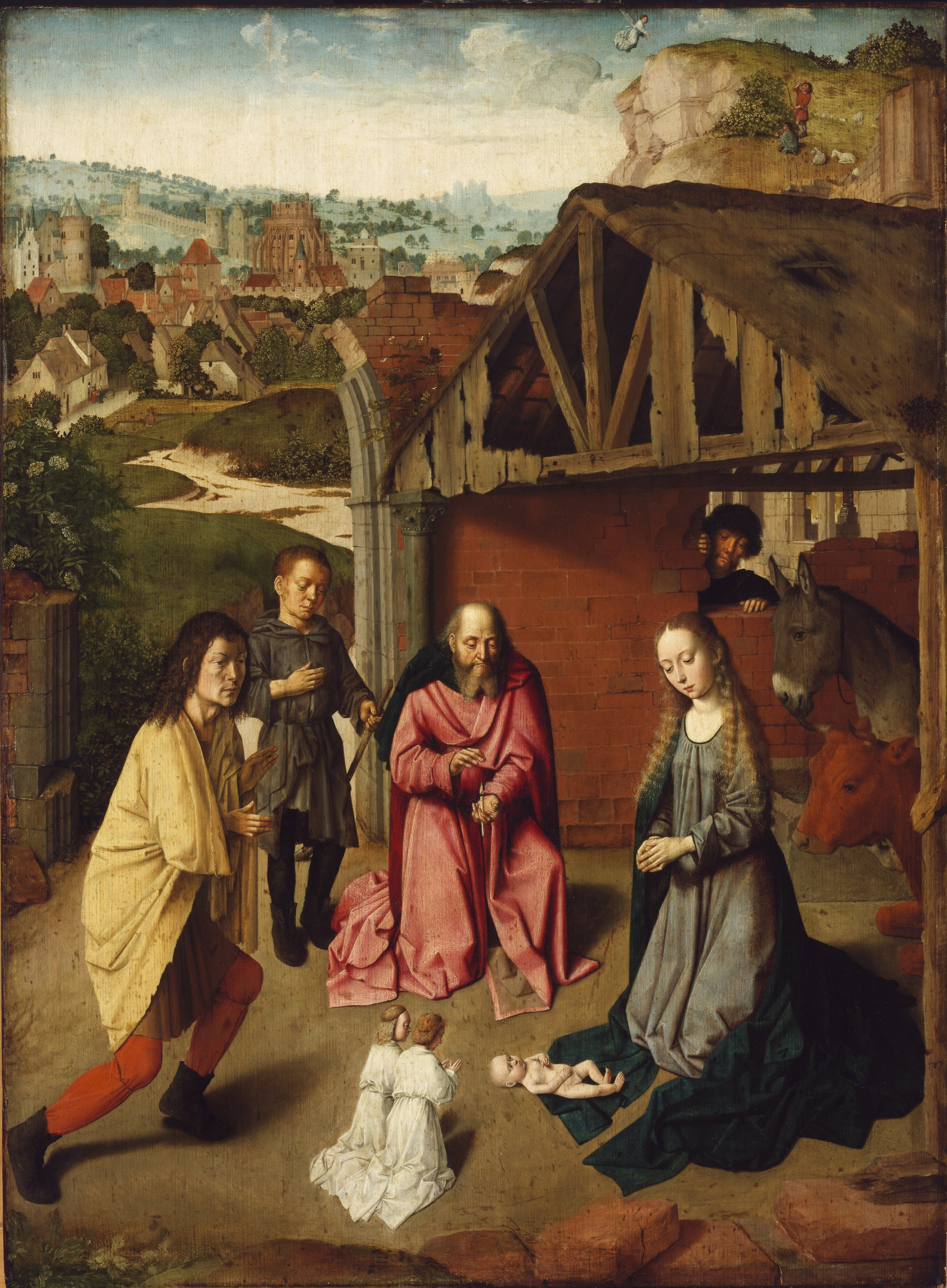
- Artist: Gerard David
- Year: c. 1485
- Medium: Oil on panel
- Dimensions: 76.7 cm × 56.7 cm (30.2 in × 22.3 in)
- Location: Museum of Fine Arts, Budapest, Hungary

The Adoration of the Shepherds or the Nativity is an oil-on-panel painting executed around 1485 by the Flemish painter Gerard David. It is now held in the Museum of Fine Arts, in Budapest.
