= Adoration of the Kings (David) =

Painting by Gerard David

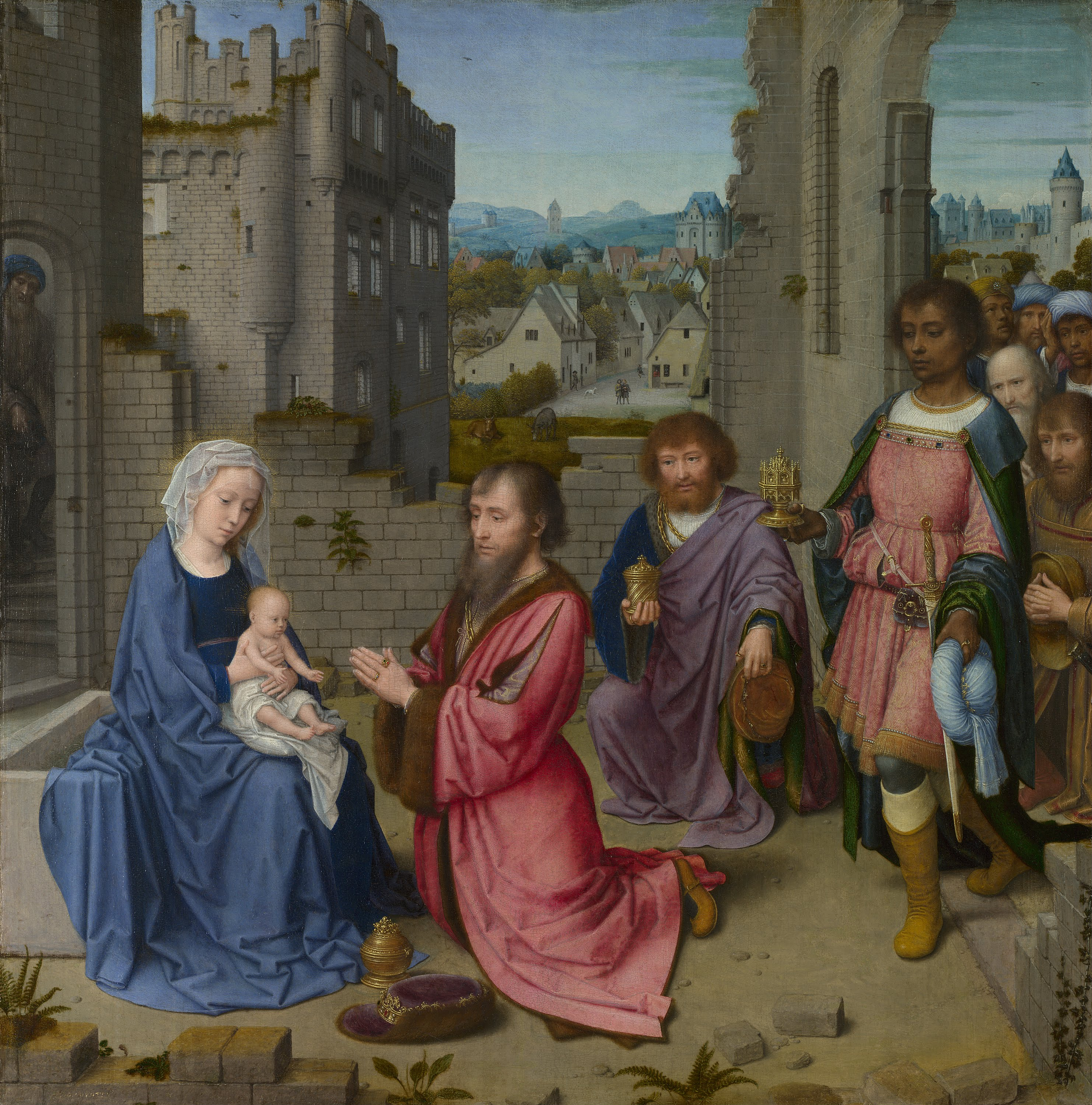
Gerard David, Adoration of the Kings, National Gallery, London, 1515–1523

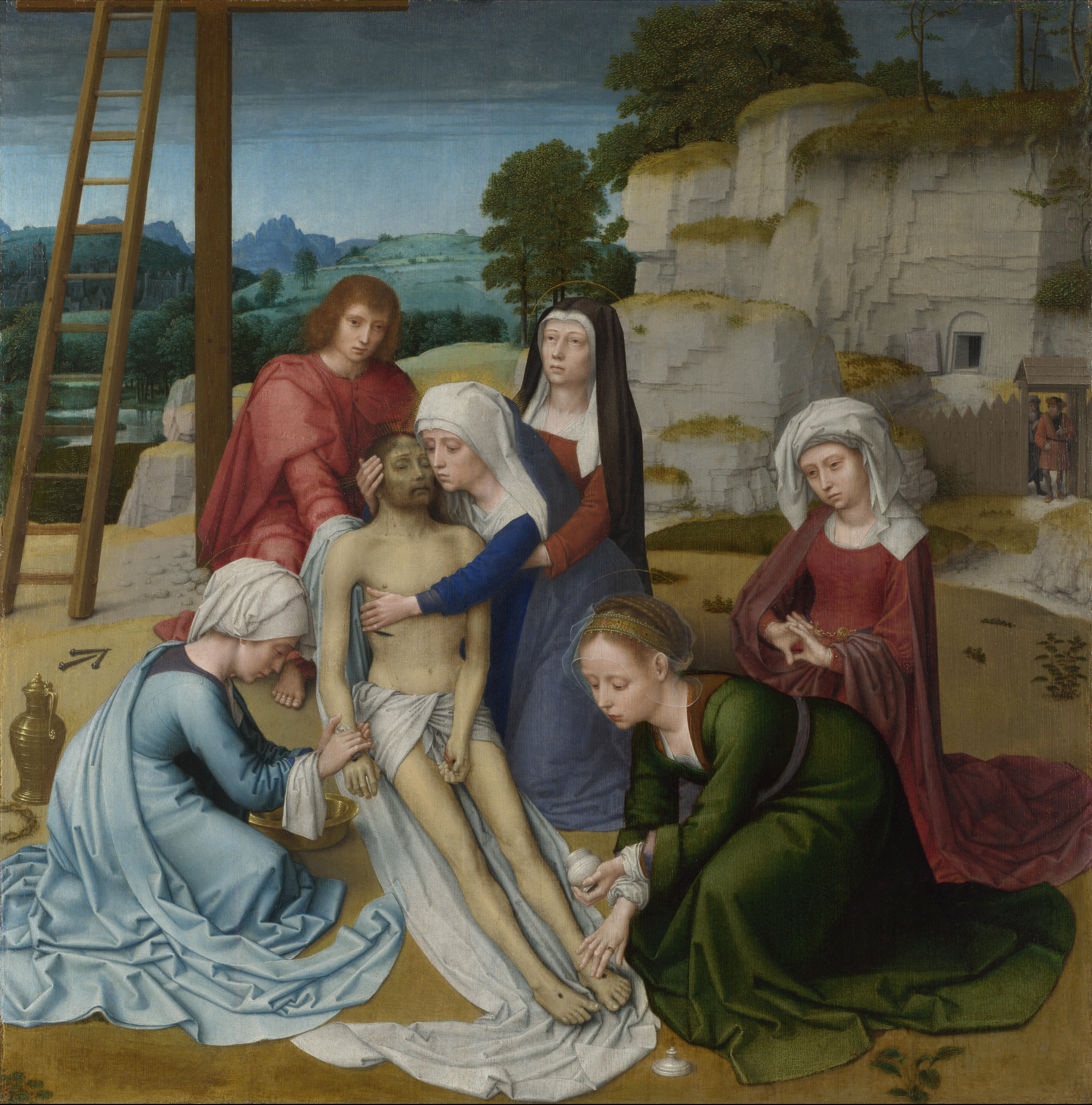
The Lamentation from the same altarpiece, also National Gallery

The Adoration of the Kings by the Early Netherlandish painter Gerard David (c. 1460 – 1523) is a painting in oil on panel, probably from after 1515, now in the National Gallery in London (NG 1079). The painted surface measures some 60 by 59.2 centimetres (23.6 in × 23.3 in), and the panel is about 2 centimetres (0.79 in) larger in both dimensions. The panel comes from a dismantled altarpiece from which one other panel appears to survive, the Lamentation that is also in the National Gallery (NG 1078).

The Adoration of the Magi (the Kings) is a common subject, which often represents the Nativity of Jesus in art, especially in this period, when the opportunity was often taken to show rich costumes in the figures of the Biblical Magi and their retinue, as for example in the slightly earlier Adoration by Jan Gossaert, also in the National Gallery, to which David is sometimes thought to have contributed. Though that is a much larger and more crowded painting, David may have borrowed aspects of the composition here from it.

However, David's treatment here is relatively simple and restrained, with the five main figures occupying most of the picture space, and none of the angels who are prominent in most of the many other depictions of the Nativity by David and his workshop. As very often, the Adoration of the Shepherds is here conflated with that of the three kings. Behind the king on the right two of the shepherds kneel, and behind them three heads from the royal retinues wear exotic turbans. Another figure in a turban stands in shadow some steps up the staircase in the tower at left, cut off at the edge of the paint. This figure is "clearly Saint Joseph".

The traditional ox and ass are not in the main scene, but can be seen through the ruined wall above the foremost king's head, respectively sitting and grazing on a patch of grass. There is a view of a section of the suburbs of Bethlehem visible at the centre, and to the right the imposing walls and skyline of the town itself.

== Original altarpiece ==
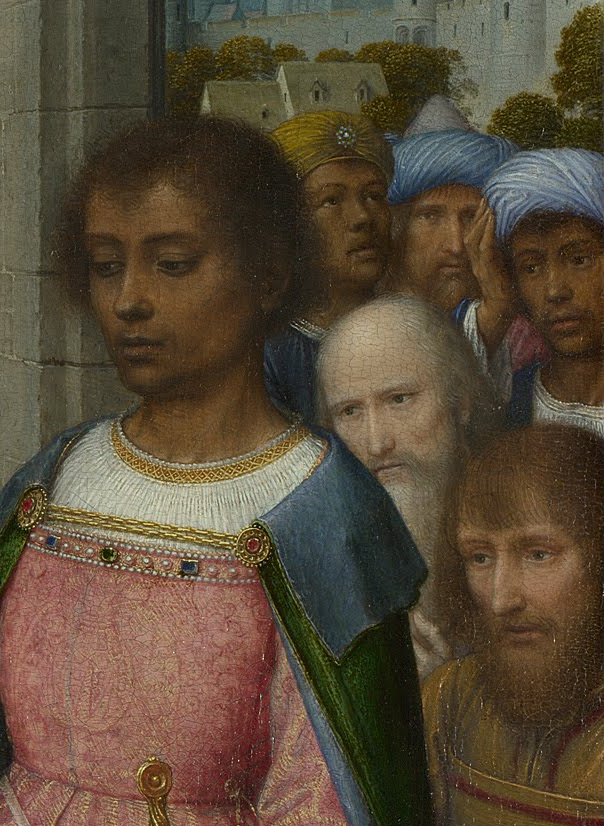
Detail of the heads at right

For all the known history of the painting it has been together with the NG 1078 Lamentation, but this goes no further back than early 19th-century London. Whether the two originally formed part of the same polyptych is not quite certain, but it seems most likely. The Lamentation is some 3 cm larger in both dimensions, and its underdrawing "is inconsistent in style and some parts can be reconciled with the underdrawing of the Adoration", but others not. In the two panels the figures are about the same size, and the horizons at the same level, and no other panels of these dimensions are attributed to David or his workshop. Both are planed down at the back, and may originally have been painted on both sides, as parts of the wings of an altarpiece on the Life of Christ or Life of the Virgin, with a central panel about four times the size of these ones.

== Provenance ==
Both this and the companion Lamentation may have been in a sale of the pictures of Frederick Benjamin King (a bankrupt sugar-refiner) at Christie's in London in June 1830, where Lot 82 was an Adoration described as by "J. de Maubeuge", that is to say Jan Gossaert, who was born in Maubeuge. The Lamentation was merely described as "Flemish". They fetched £4 and £4, 12 shillings respectively, but different buyers are recorded. Both paintings have a pink paper label inscribed "King 157" pasted on their reverses. If they were separated at this point, they were reunited by 1831, when their certain history begins, in the collection of Karl Aders, a German merchant resident in London. Both were auctioned again in August 1835 and bought by a Dr Willis, later passing to a surgeon, Joseph Henry Green, who lived in Monken Hadley, a little way north of London. Both paintings were exhibited in the huge and important Art Treasures Exhibition, held in Manchester in 1857. Green died in 1863 and his widow (Anne Eliza, d. 1879) bequeathed all the Dutch and Flemish paintings in the collection to the National Gallery, who received them in 1880. No loans to outside exhibitions are recorded since (to 1998).

== Attribution ==
The painting is now considered likely to be mainly by David himself, with the usual assistance from his workshop – at this date he may have been running two simultaneously, in Antwerp and Bruges. It is certainly in his style, and "none of David's immediate followers seems to have had sufficient skill to produce a composition of such pleasing simplicity" and "the technique agrees in most respects with David's".

Like many Early Netherlandish paintings, it has been attributed to many other painters in the past, as understanding of the period developed. The painting auctioned in 1830 was described as by Jan Gossaert, and in the Aders sale and Green collection it was described as a Hans Memling. Of the early authorities, Gustav Friedrich Waagen in the 1850s called it "School of van Eyck" and Johann David Passavant in the 1830s a "Rogier van der Weyden the younger". The National Gallery cautiously first catalogued it merely as "Flemish School", only changing to David in 1920. This had first been suggested by Georges Hulin de Loo in 1902, although he did not think the painting was from the hand of the master himself. In 20th century scholarship the main issue debated was the share of work between master and workshop.
