= Lamentation (Gerard David) =

Painting by Gerard David

Lamentation of Christ
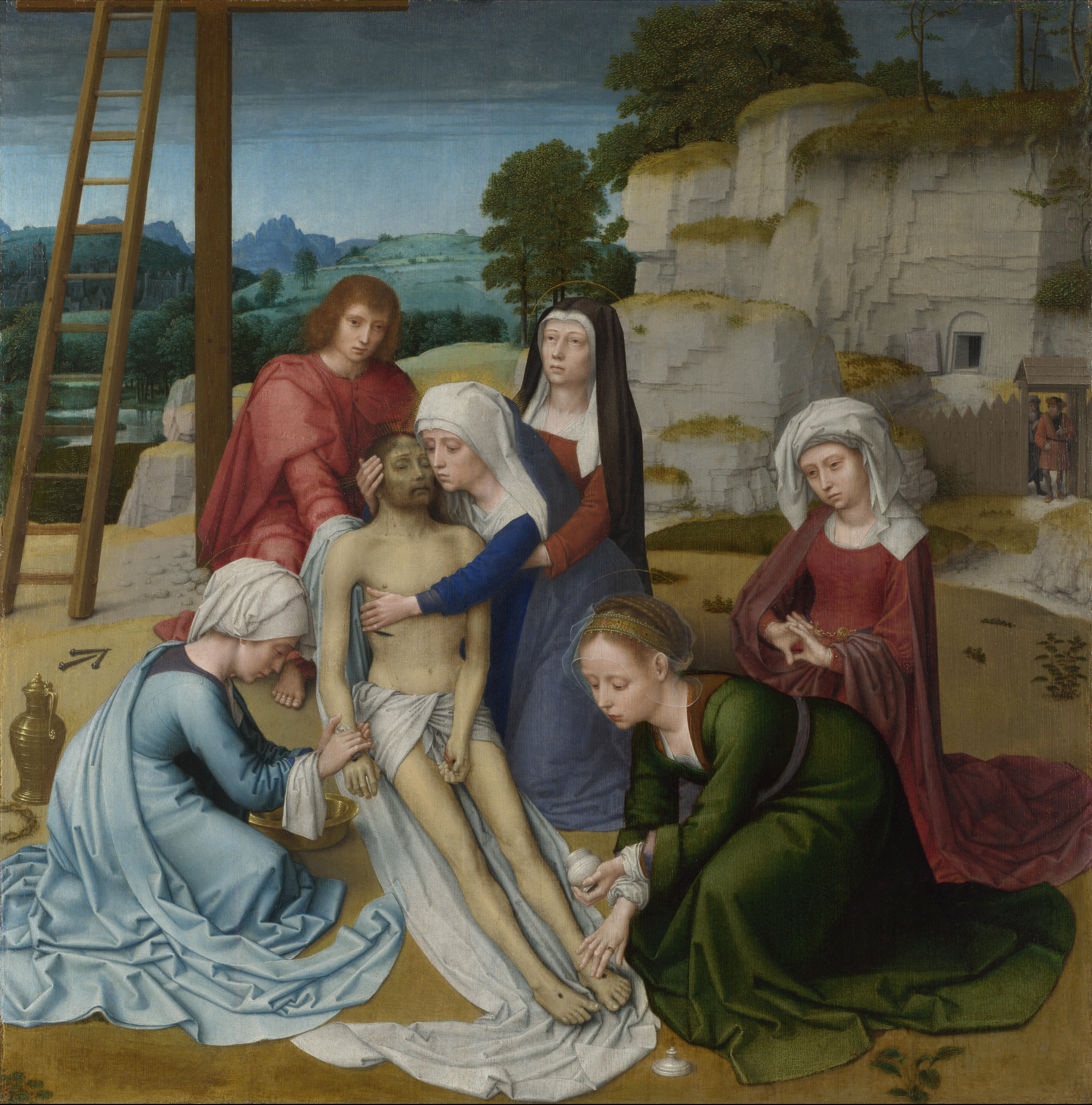
- Artist: Gerard David
- Year: 1515–1523
- Medium: Oil on oak
- Dimensions: 63 cm × 61.5 cm (25 in × 24.2 in)
- Location: National Gallery, London, UK
- Accession: NG1078

The Lamentation of Christ is a painting of the common subject of the Lamentation of Christ by the painter and manuscript illuminator Gerard David. It was originally created as a wing for a now dismantled and lost altarpiece.

== Description ==
It portrays the body of Christ wrapped in his shroud and being anointed. Mary Magdalene is at his feet, as the Virgin Mary holds him in her arms, weeping for his death watched over by Saint John. Four other grieving figures are present; they may be Saint Anne, the mother of the Virgin, and women who followed Christ.

== Style ==
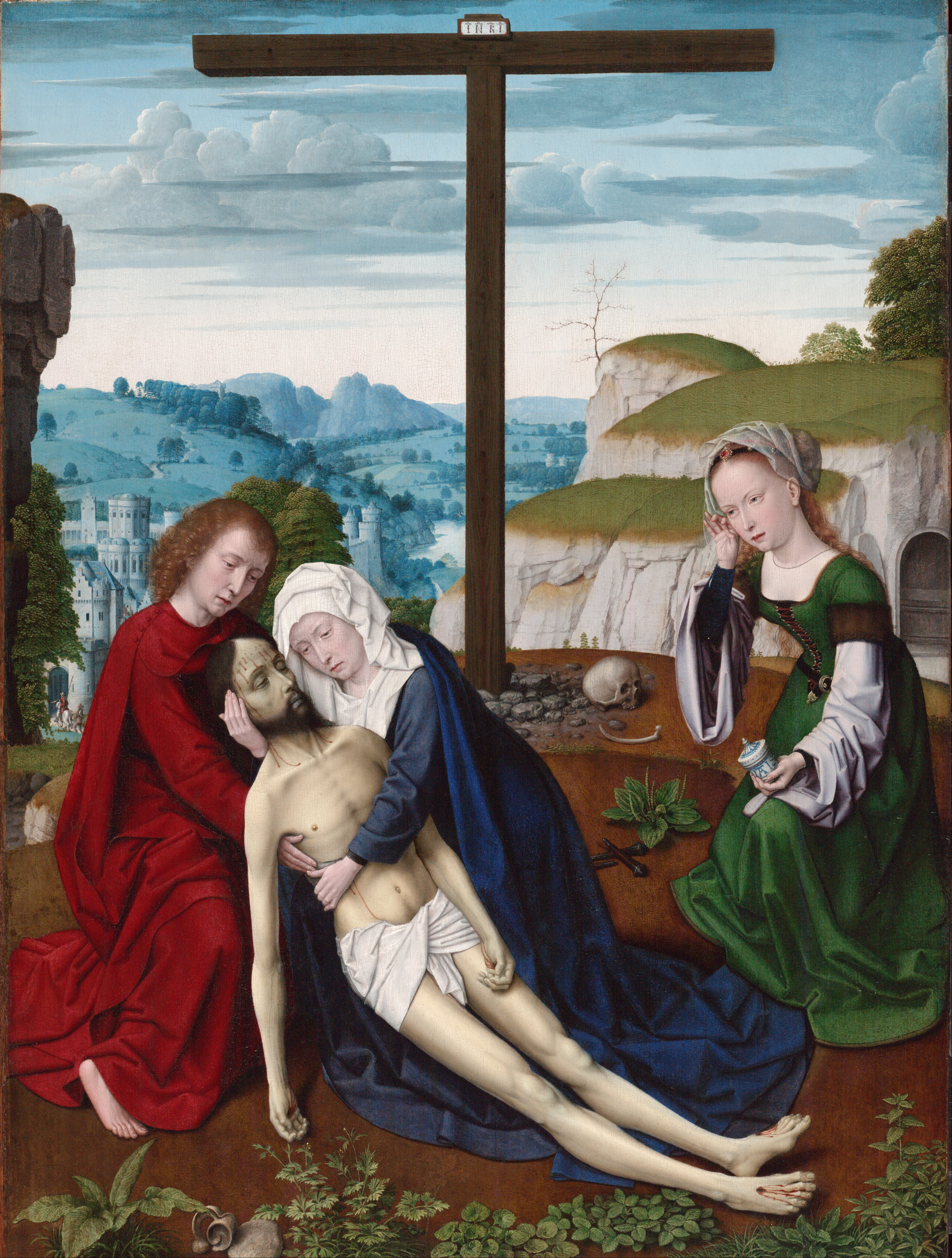
Another Lamentation (c. 1515–1520) by Gerard David in the Philadelphia Museum of Art

While its exact dating is debated, it seems likely that it was completed between 1515 and 1523. This painting and David's Adoration of the Kings, also in the National Gallery (NG 1079), were two wings from a single altarpiece. The theme of the Lamentation of Christ was common in medieval and Renaissance art, although this treatment, dating back to a subject known as the Anointing of Christ, is unusual for the period. David was influenced by Jan van Eyck's approach to realism. David was innovative in his depiction of religious subjects, which he represented not as icons but rather as approachable individuals. Additionally, David was known for the originality of his treatment of color and light.

== Original altarpiece ==
For all the known history of the painting it has been together with the NG 1079 Adoration, but this goes no further back than early 19th-century London. Whether the two originally formed part of the same polyptych is not quite certain, but it seems most likely. The Lamentation is some 3 cm larger in both dimensions, and its underdrawing "is inconsistent in style and some parts can be reconciled with the underdrawing of the Adoration", but others not. In the two panels the figures are about the same size, and the horizons at the same level, and no other panels of these dimensions are attributed to David or his workshop. Both panels are planed down at the back, and may originally have been painted on both sides, as parts of the wings of an altarpiece on the Life of Christ or Life of the Virgin, with a central panel about four times the size of these ones.

== Provenance ==
Both this and the companion Adoration may have been in a sale of the pictures of Frederick Benjamin King (a bankrupt sugar-refiner) at Christie's in London in June 1830, where Lot 82 was an Adoration described as by "J. de Maubeuge", that is to say Jan Gossaert, who was born in Maubeuge. The Lamentation was merely described as "Flemish". They fetched £4 and £4,12 shillings respectively, but different buyers are recorded. Both paintings have a pink paper label inscribed "King 157" pasted on their reverses.

If they were separated at this point, they were reunited by 1831, when their certain history begins, in the collection of Karl Aders, a German merchant resident in London. Both were auctioned again in August 1835 and bought by a Dr Willis, later passing to a surgeon, Joseph Henry Green, who lived in Monken Hadley, a little way north of London. Both paintings were exhibited in the huge and important Art Treasures Exhibition, held in Manchester in 1857. Green died in 1863 and his widow (Anne Eliza, d. 1879) bequeathed all the Dutch and Flemish paintings in the collection to the National Gallery, who received them in 1880. No loans to outside exhibitions are recorded since (to 1998).
