= The Marriage at Cana (Gerard David) =

Painting by Gerard David

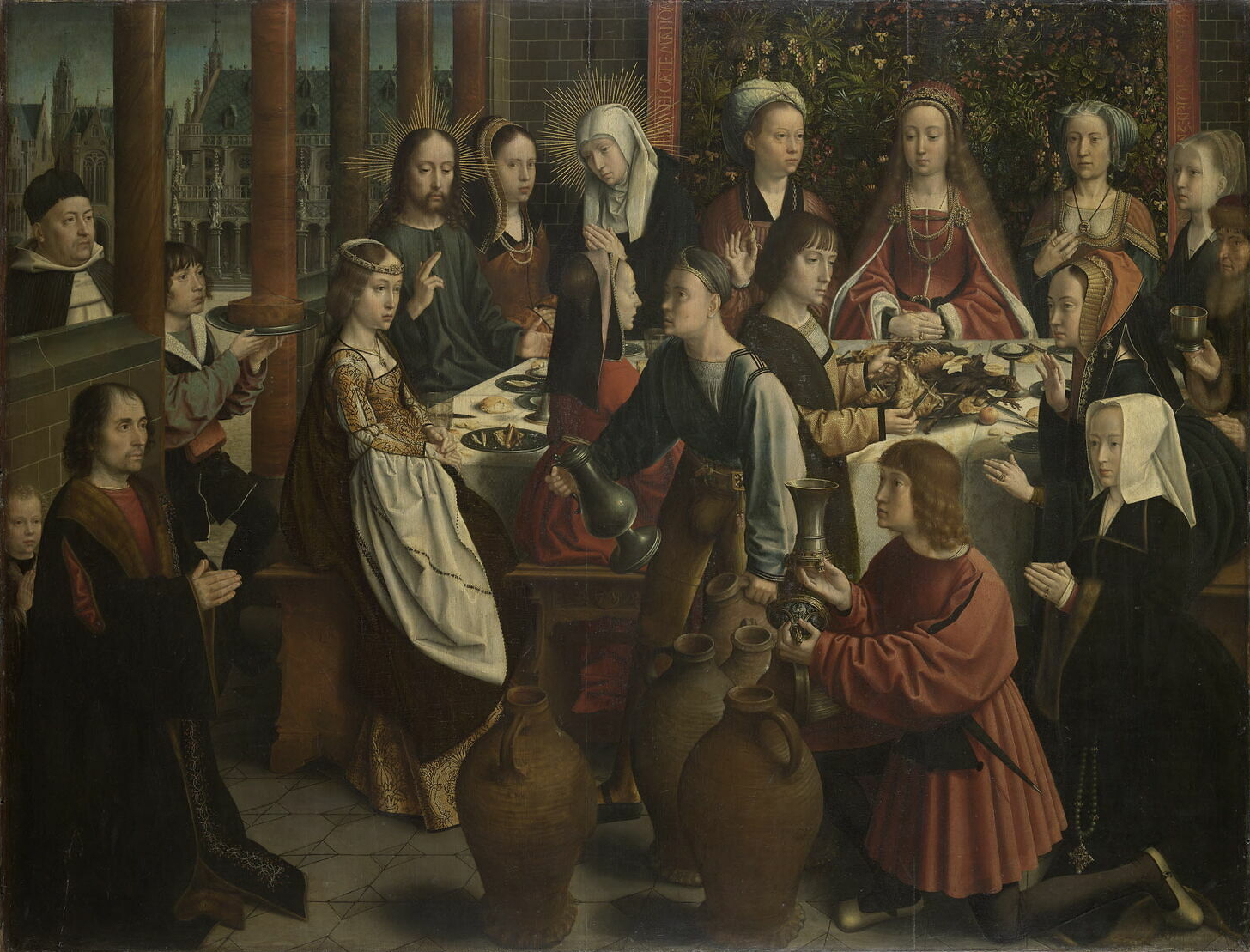
The Marriage at Cana by Gerard David, 1500-1510

The Marriage at Cana is a panel painting in oils by Early Netherlandish painter Gerard David, dated to 1500-1510. It measures 100 by 128 centimetres (39 in × 50 in), and is in the collection of the Louvre. It shows the Marriage at Cana, one of Jesus's miracles described in the New Testament.

The middle-aged couple kneeling at either side are clearly donor portraits, but several other figures are probably portraits of their family members: the young man kneeling at the front, the boy behind his father, the cleric (a Dominican or Augustinian friar) outside the window, and some (possibly all) of the figures seated at the table, except for Christ and the Virgin Mary, who are shown with halos. The richly-dressed bride wears red, and has her hair displayed at full-length, something that respectable women rarely did in public, except at weddings. The bridegroom is presumably the young man carving a bird.

The painting thought to have been commissioned by Jean de Sedano (d. 1518), a Spanish merchant settled in Bruges. In the 1490s, he had commissioned the Triptych of the Sedano family, a more traditional triptych also with donor portraits of himself, his wife, and a son (possibly grown up to be the wine-server here). This is also now in the Louvre.
