= Agony in the Garden (David) =

Painting by Gerard David

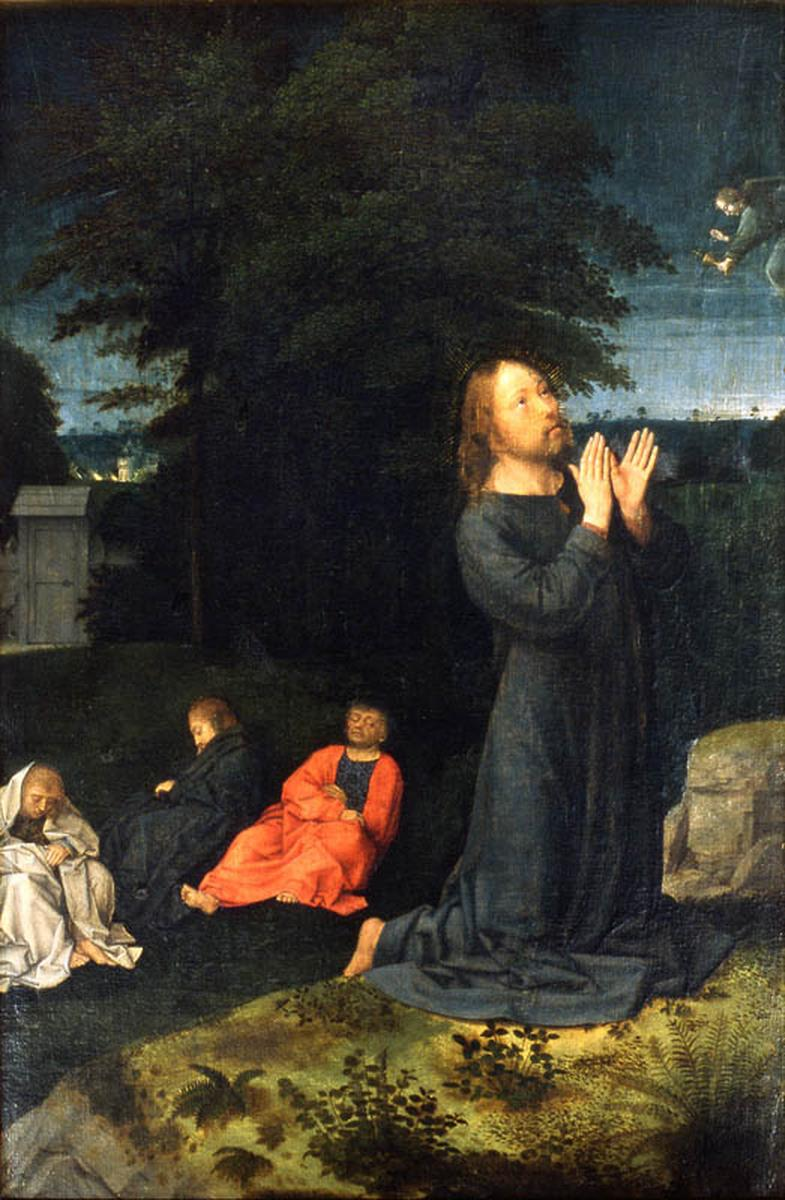
- Artist: Gerard David
- Year: circa 1510–1520
- Medium: oil painting on panel transferred on canvas
- Movement: Early Netherlandish painting
- Subject: Agony in the Garden
- Dimensions: 43 cm × 29.3 cm (17 in × 11.5 in)
- Location: Musée des Beaux-Arts, Strasbourg
- Accession: 1902

Agony in the Garden is a 1510s religious painting by the Netherlandish artist Gerard David. It depicts Christ kneeling on the Mount of Olives in prayer, with his disciples Peter, James and John sleeping near to him. The painting is now in the Musée des Beaux-Arts of Strasbourg, France. Its inventory numbers is 465.

The painting (a nocturne) was bought by the director of the Strasbourg museum, Wilhelm von Bode, from the estate of Marie von Sayn-Wittgenstein-Sayn, widow of Chlodwig, Prince of Hohenlohe-Schillingsfürst. It had previously been recorded in Saint Petersburg, Russia, in 1825. The painting was at first attributed to the studio of Gerard David, and then, for a long time, to Adriaen Isenbrandt, for instance by Max J. Friedlaender. Since 2002, Agony in the Garden is recognized as a work by David by Maryan Ainsworth and other specialists.
