= Gerard David =

Early Netherlandish painter (c. 1460–1523)

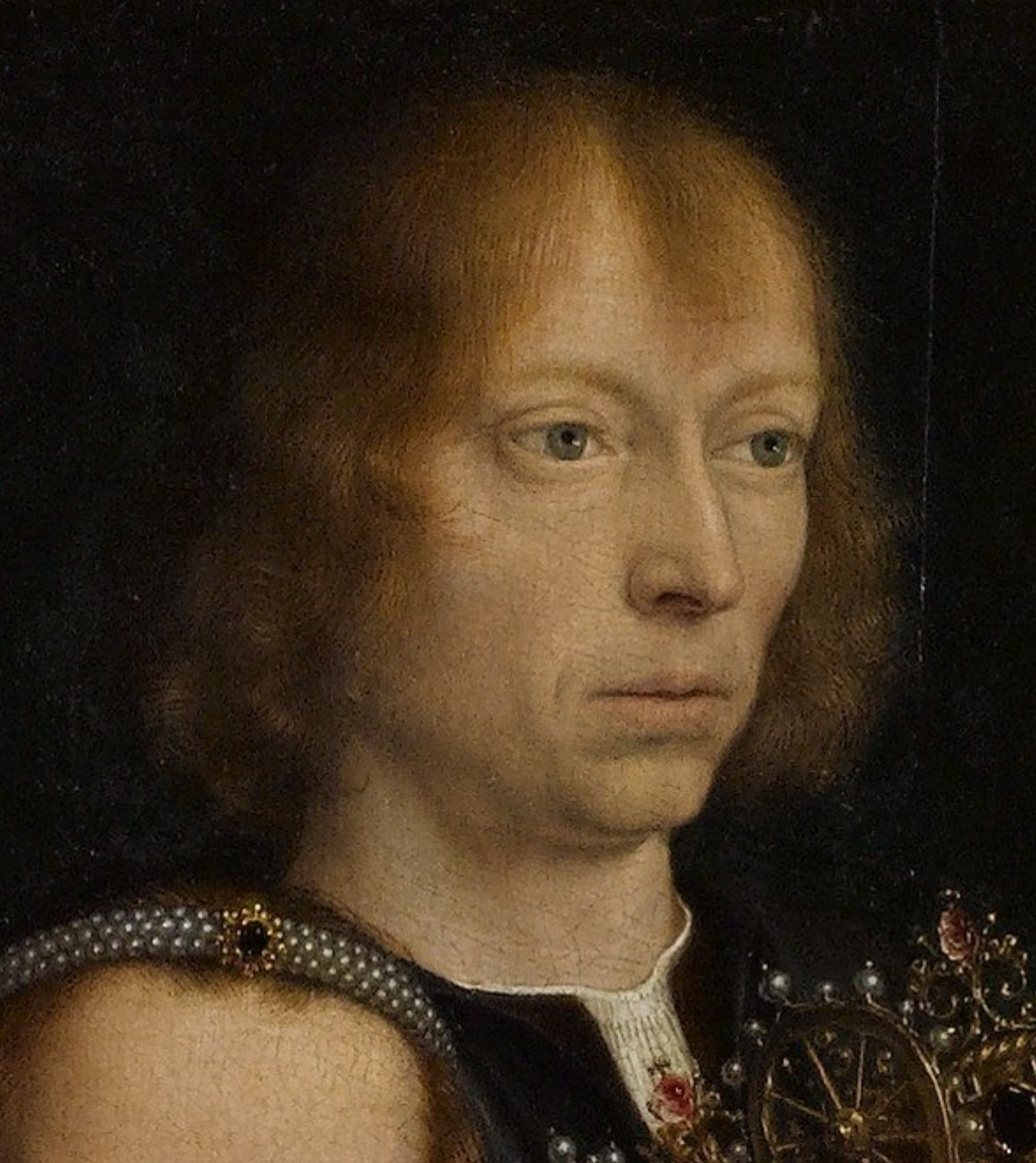
- Self-portrait in The Virgin among the Virgins, 1509, Musée des Beaux-Arts, Rouen
- Born: c. 1460; Oudewater, Prince-Bishopric of Utrecht, Holy Roman Empire
- Died: 13 August 1523 (aged 62–63); Bruges, County of Flanders, Habsburg Netherlands
- Known for: Painting
- Movement: Early Netherlandish painting

Gerard David (c. 1460 – 13 August 1523) was an Early Netherlandish painter and manuscript illuminator known for his brilliant use of color. Only a bare outline of his life survives, although some facts are known. He may have been the Meester gheraet van brugghe who became a master of the Antwerp guild in 1515. He was very successful in his lifetime and probably ran two workshops, in Antwerp and Bruges. Like many painters of his period, his reputation diminished in the 17th century until he was rediscovered in the 19th century.

== Life ==
He was born in Oudewater, now located in the province of Utrecht. His year of birth is approximated as c. 1450–1460 on the basis that he looks to be around 50 years in the 1509 self-portrait found in his Virgin among the Virgins. He is believed to have spent time in Italy from 1470 to 1480, where he was influenced by the Italian Renaissance. He formed his early style under Albert van Oudewater in Haarlem, and moved to Bruges in 1483, where he joined the Guild of Saint Luke in 1484.

Erwin Panofsky identifies David as a student of Geertgen tot Sint Jans. Upon the death of Hans Memling in 1494, David became Bruges' leading painter. He became dean of the guild in 1501, and in 1496 married Cornelia Cnoop, daughter of the dean of the goldsmiths' guild. David was one of the town's leading citizens. Ambrosius Benson served his apprenticeship with David. Around 1519 they had a dispute over a number of paintings and drawings which Benson had collected from other artists. David refused to return the materials because Benson owed him a large debt. Benson sought legal recourse in court and after he won, David was condemned to a prison term.

He died on 13 August 1523 and was buried in the Church of Our Lady in Bruges.

== Style ==
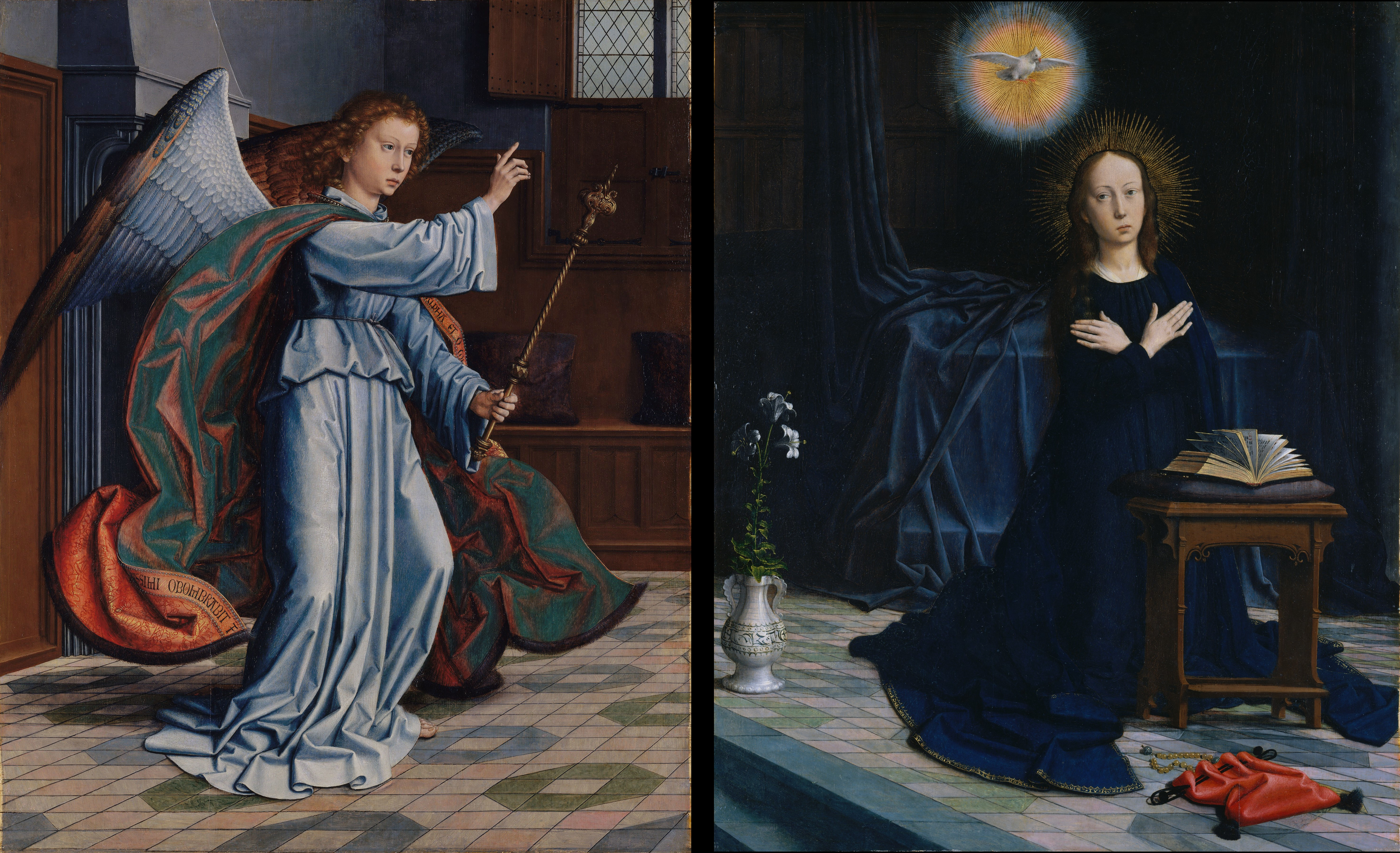
The Annunciation, 1506

David's surviving work mainly consists of religious scenes. They are characterised by an atmospheric, timeless, and almost dream-like serenity, achieved through soft, warm and subtle colourisation, and masterful handling of light and shadow. He is innovative in his recasting of traditional themes and in his approach to landscape, which was then only an emerging genre in northern European painting. His ability with landscape can be seen in the detailed foliage of his Triptych of the Baptism and the forest scene in the New York Nativity.

Many of the art historians of the early 20th century, including Erwin Panofsky and Max Jakob Friedländer saw him as a painter who did little but distill the style of others and painted in an archaic and unimaginative style. However, today most view him as a master colourist, and a painter who, according to the Metropolitan Museum of Art, worked in a "progressive, even enterprising, mode, casting off his late medieval heritage and proceeding with a certain purity of vision in an age of transition."

In his early work David followed Haarlem artists such as Dirk Bouts, Albert van Oudewater, and Geertgen tot Sint Jans, though he had already given evidence of superior power as a colourist. To this early period belong the St John of the Richard von Kaufmann collection in Berlin and the Salting's St Jerome. In Bruges, he came directly under the influence of Memling, the master whom he followed most closely. It was from him that David acquired a solemnity of treatment, greater realism in the rendering of human form, and an orderly arrangement of figures.

He visited Antwerp in 1515 and was impressed with the work of Quentin Matsys, who had introduced a greater vitality and intimacy in the conception of sacred themes. Together they worked to preserve the traditions of the Bruges school against influences of the Italian Renaissance.

== Works ==
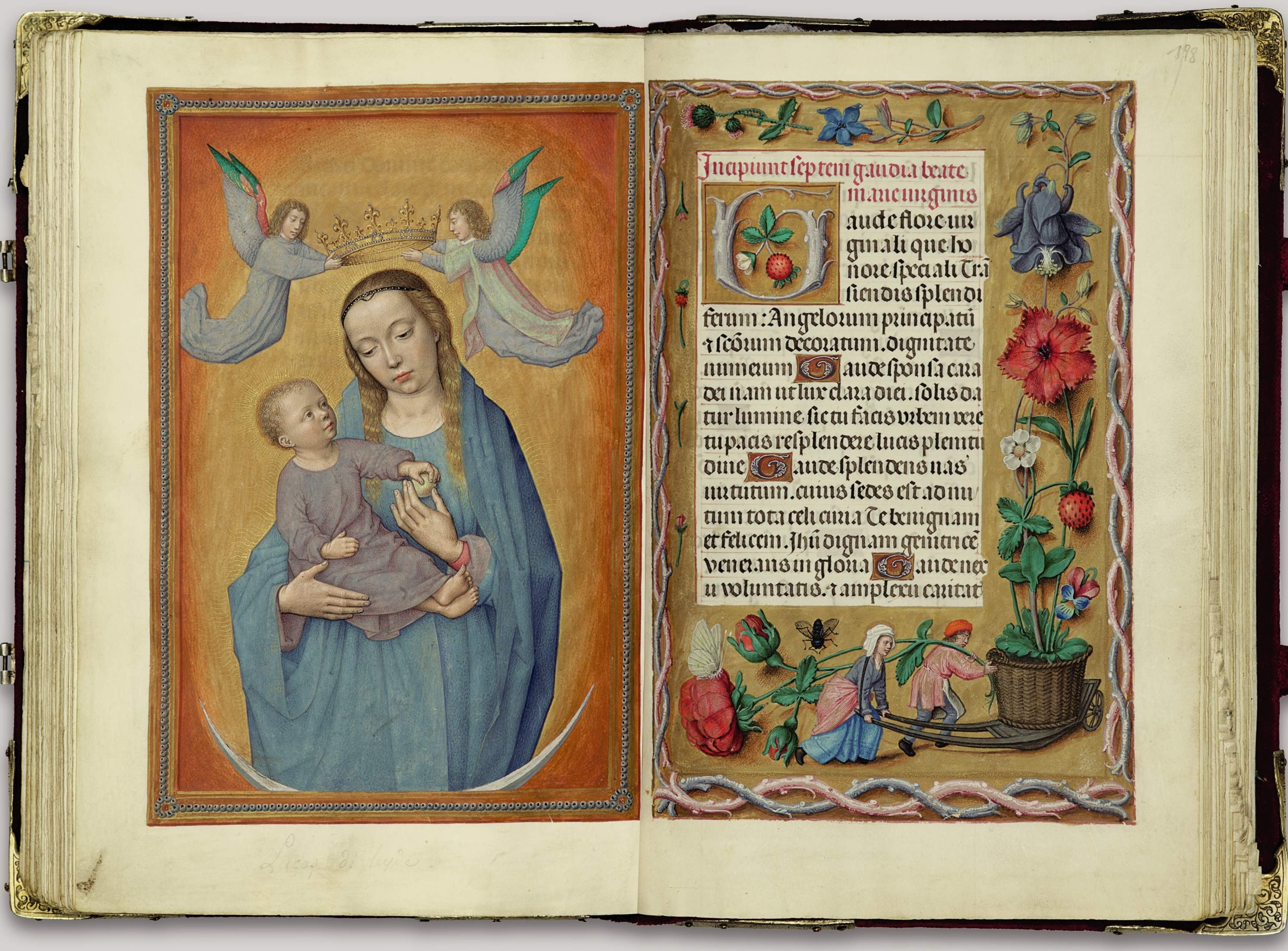
Virgin and Child on a Crescent Moon in the Rothschild Prayerbook, c. 1500–1520

The works for which David is best known are the altarpieces painted before his visit to Antwerp: the Marriage of St Catherine at the National Gallery, London; the triptych of the Madonna Enthroned and Saints of the Brignole-Sale collection in Genoa; the Annunciation of the Sigmaringen collection; and above all, the Madonna with Angels and Saints (usually titled The Virgin among the Virgins), which he donated to the Carmelite Nuns of Sion at Bruges, and which is now in the Rouen museum.

Only a few of his works have remained in Bruges: The Judgment of Cambyses, The Flaying of Sisamnes and the Baptism of Christ in the Groeningemuseum, and the Transfiguration in the Church of Our Lady.

The rest were scattered around the world, and to this may be due the oblivion into which his very name had fallen; this, and the fact that, some believed that for all the beauty and the soulfulness of his work, he had nothing innovative to add to the history of art.

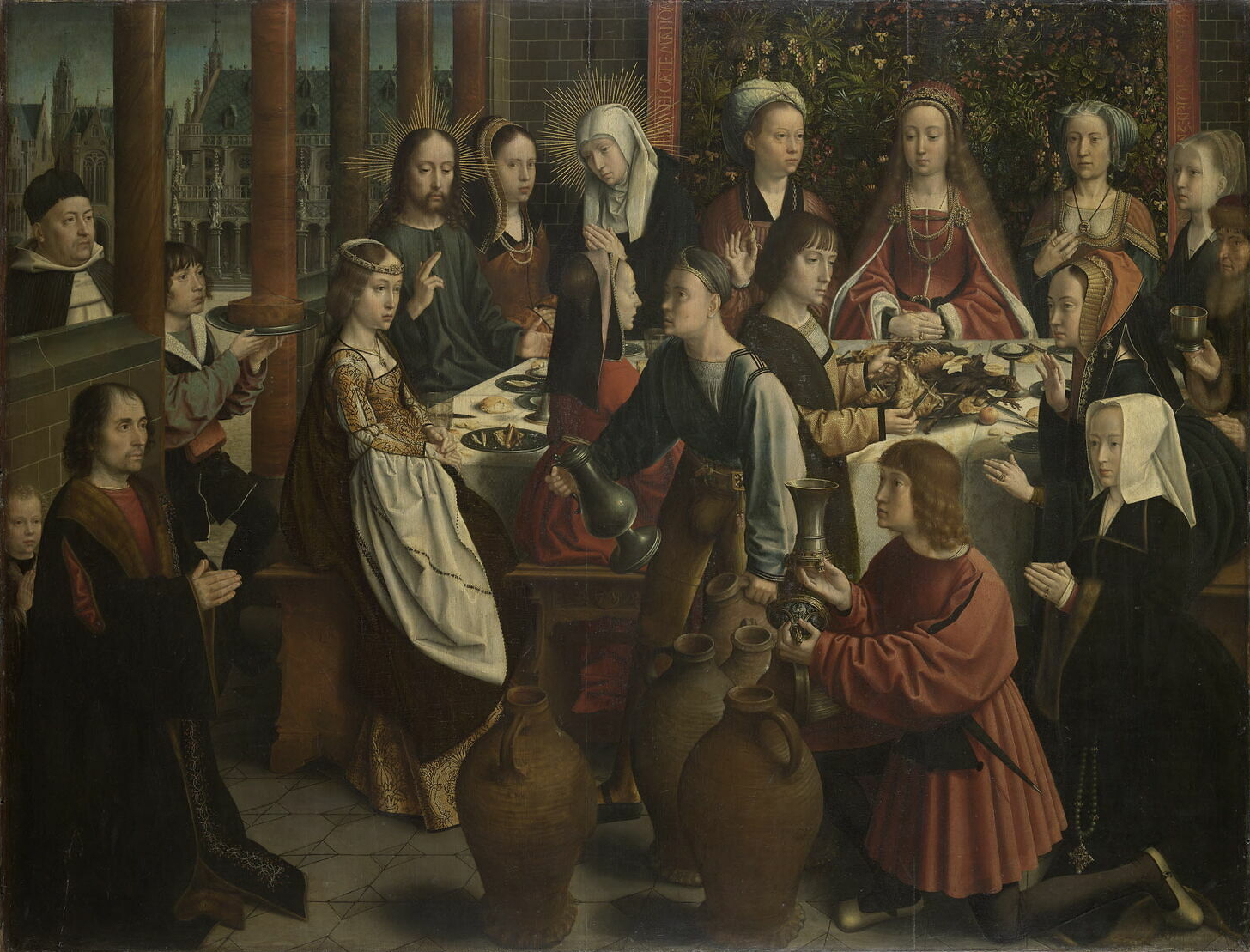
The Marriage at Cana (Gerard David), c. 1500. Louvre

Even in his best work, he had only produced new variations of the art of his predecessors and contemporaries. His rank among the masters was renewed, however, when a number of his paintings were assembled at the seminal 1902 Gruuthusemuseum, Bruges exhibition of early Flemish painters.

He also worked closely with the leading manuscript illuminators of the day, and seems to have been brought in to paint specific important miniatures himself, among them a Virgin among the Virgins in the Morgan Library, a Virgin and Child on a Crescent Moon in the Rothschild Prayerbook, and a portrait of the Emperor Maximilian in Vienna. Several of his drawings also survive, and elements from these appear in the works of other painters and illuminators for several decades after his death.

Lesser-known but also of high quality are the works of David found in Spanish public collections. The Prado Museum in Madrid owns a table "Rest on the flight into Egypt" resembling the one in the Royal Museum of Fine Arts in Antwerp. The Prado also holds another two Works by the painter, one of them only attributed. Another of the Spanish capital's Museums, The Thyssen-Bornemisza holds a "Crucifixión" from 1475.

== Legacy ==
At the time of David's death, the glory of Bruges and its painters was on the wane: Antwerp had become the leader in art as well as in political and commercial importance. Of David's pupils in Bruges, only Adriaen Isenbrandt, Albert Cornelis, and Ambrosius Benson achieved importance. Among other Flemish painters, Joachim Patinir, Jan Mabuse and the Master of the Plump-Cheeked Madonnas were to some degree influenced by him.

David's name had been completely forgotten when in 1866 William Henry James Weale discovered documents about him in the archives of Bruges; these brought to light the main facts of the painter's life and led to the reconstruction of David's artistic personality, beginning with the recognition of David's only documented work, the Virgin Among Virgins at Rouen.

== Gallery ==
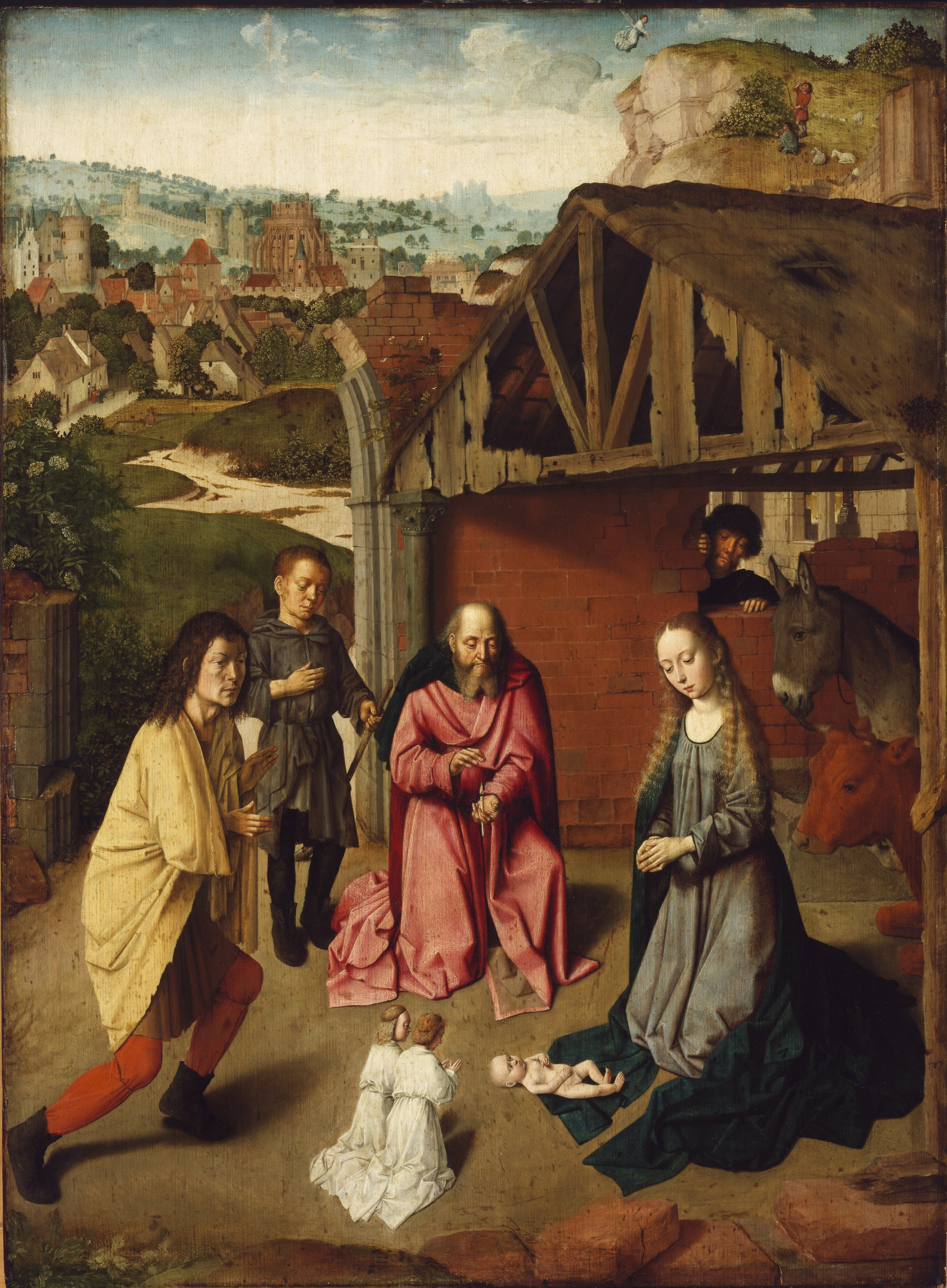
The Adoration of the Shepherds, c. 1485, Museum of Fine Arts, Budapest

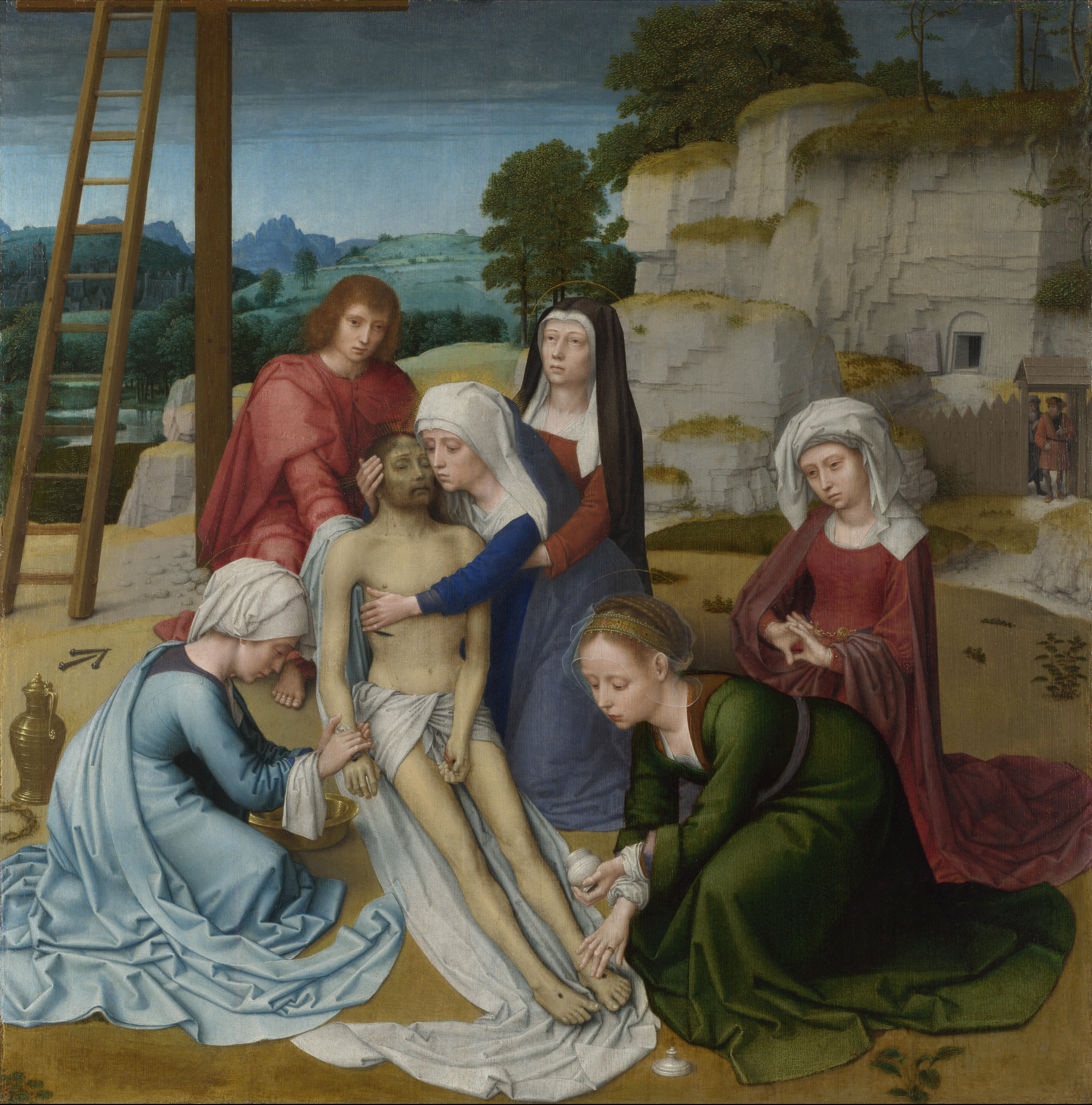
Lamentation, c 1495–1500. National Gallery, London, UK

The Judgement of Cambyses, 1498. Groeninge Museum, Bruges.

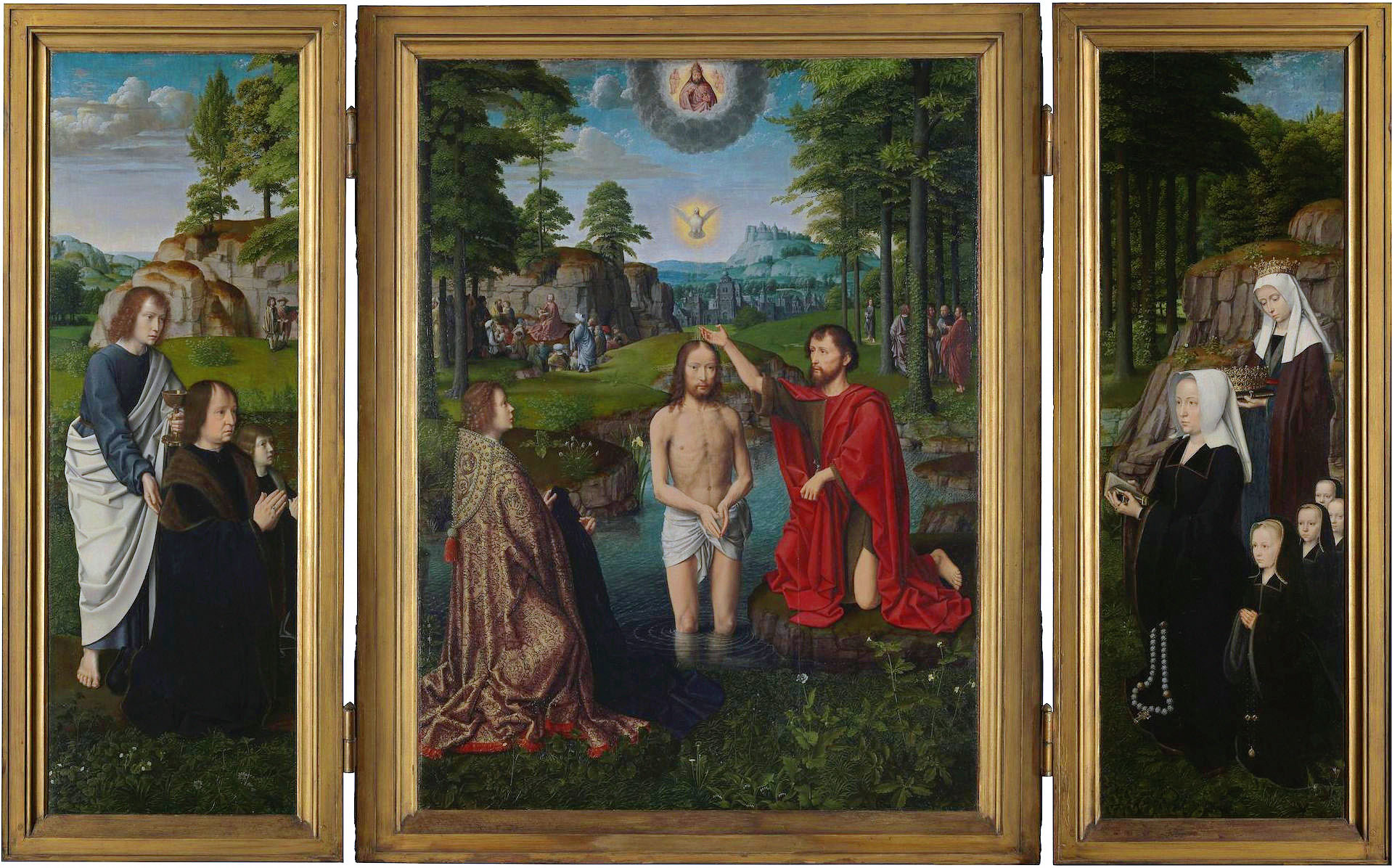
Triptych of Jean des Trompes, 1505. Groeninge Museum, Bruges

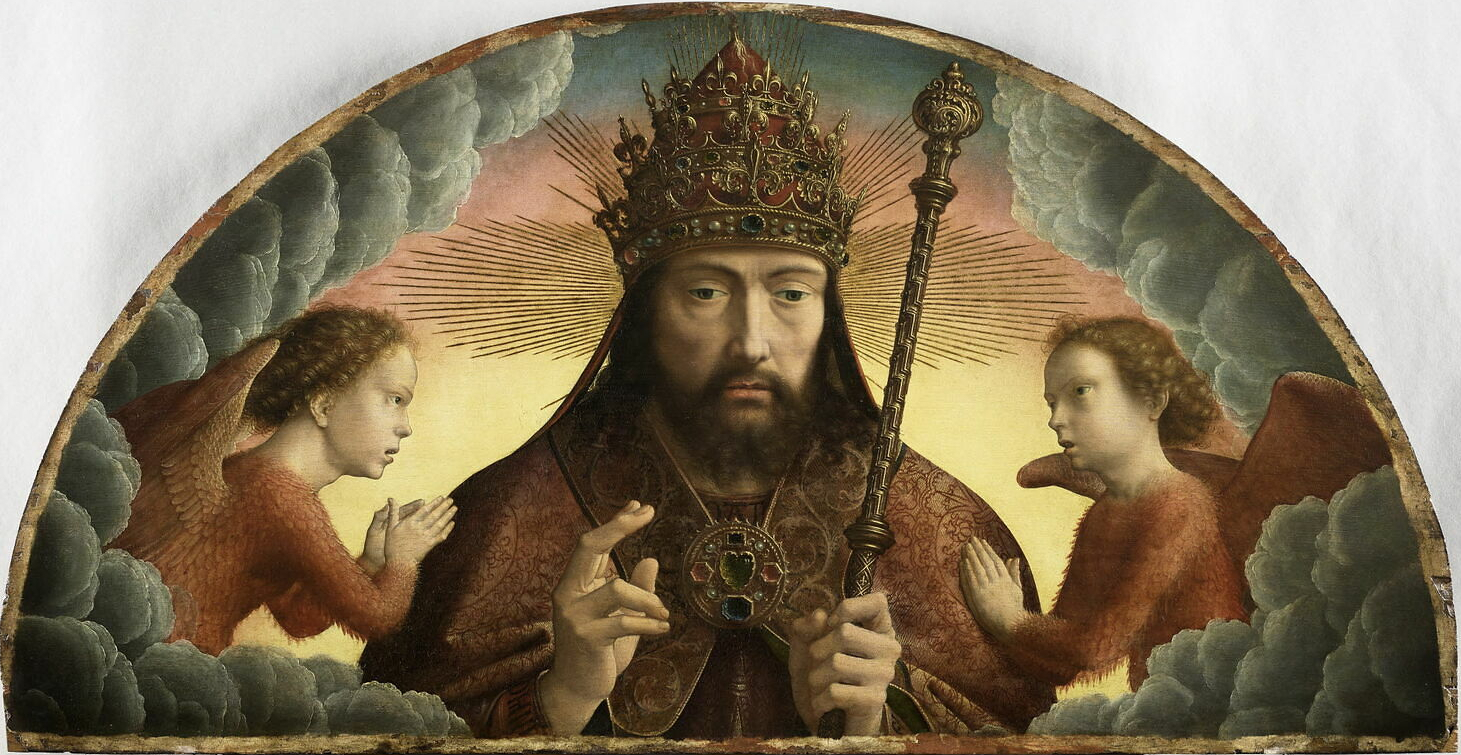
God the Father 1506, Louvre, Paris

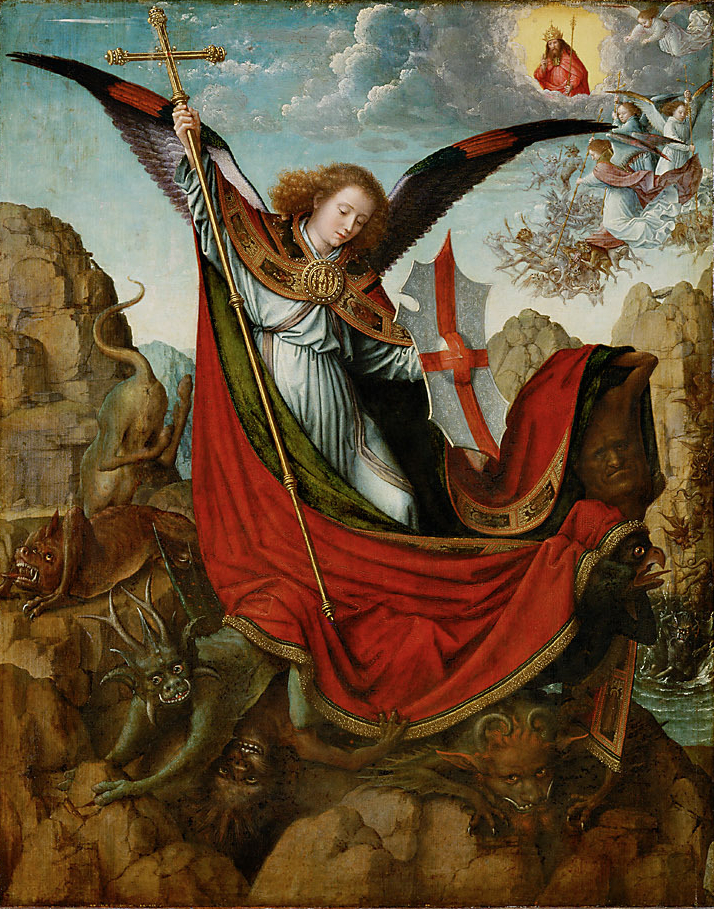
Altarpiece of St Michael c. 1510. Kunsthistorisches Museum, Vienna

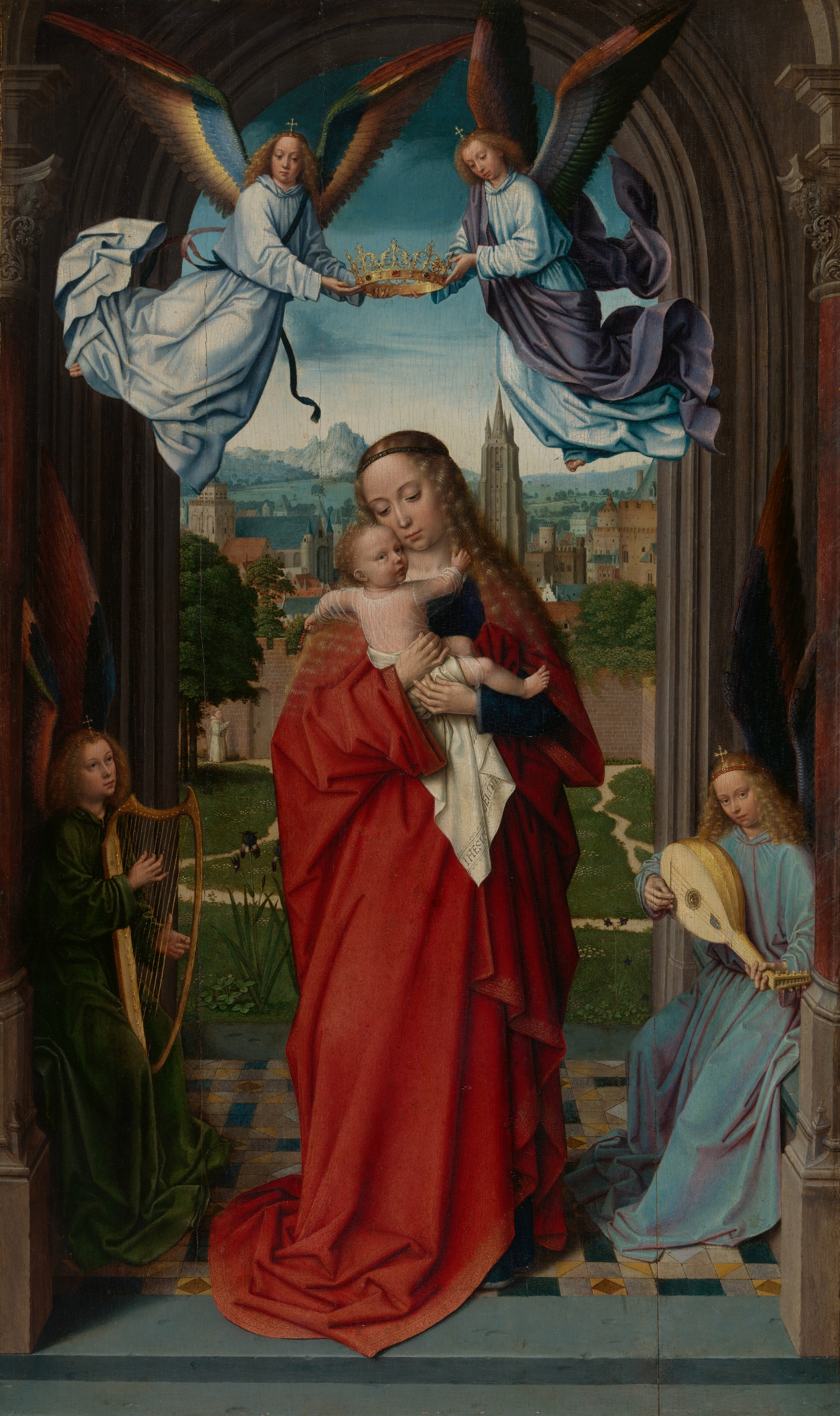
Virgin and Child with Four Angels, c. 1510–1515. Metropolitan Museum of Art, New York

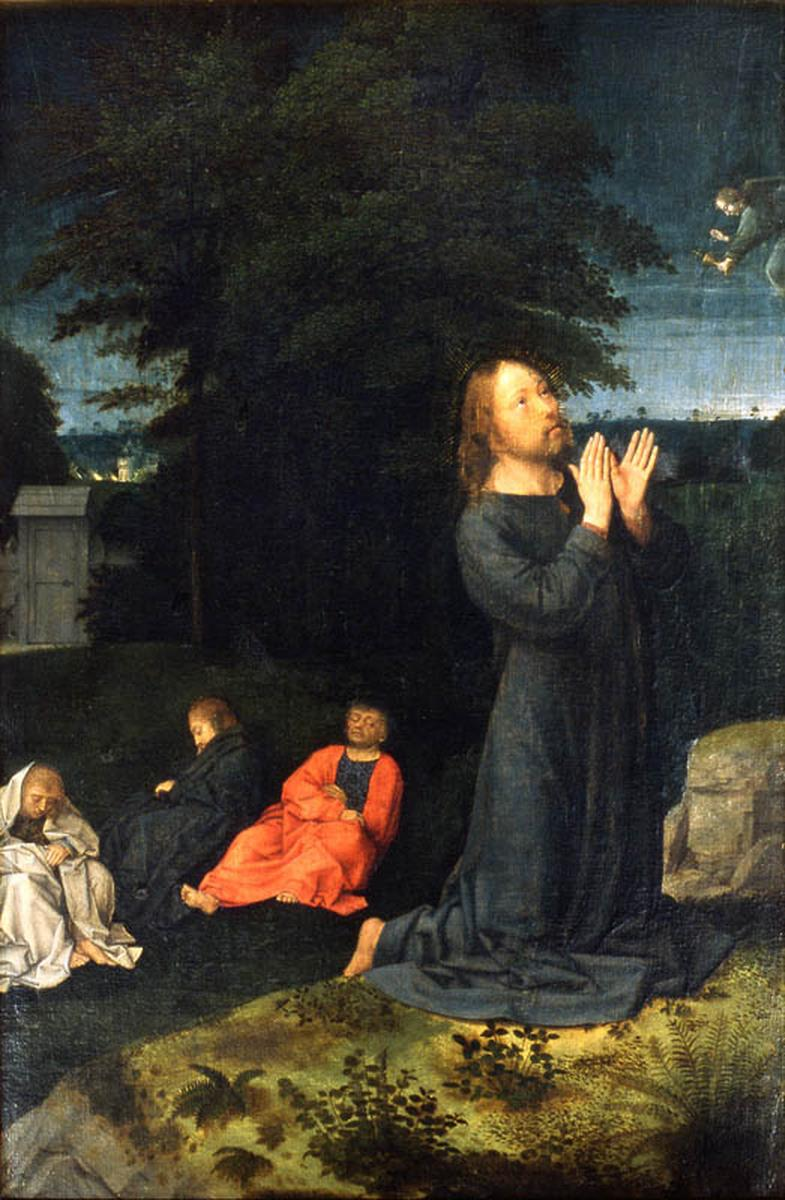
Agony in the Garden, c. 1510–1520. Musée des Beaux-Arts de Strasbourg, France

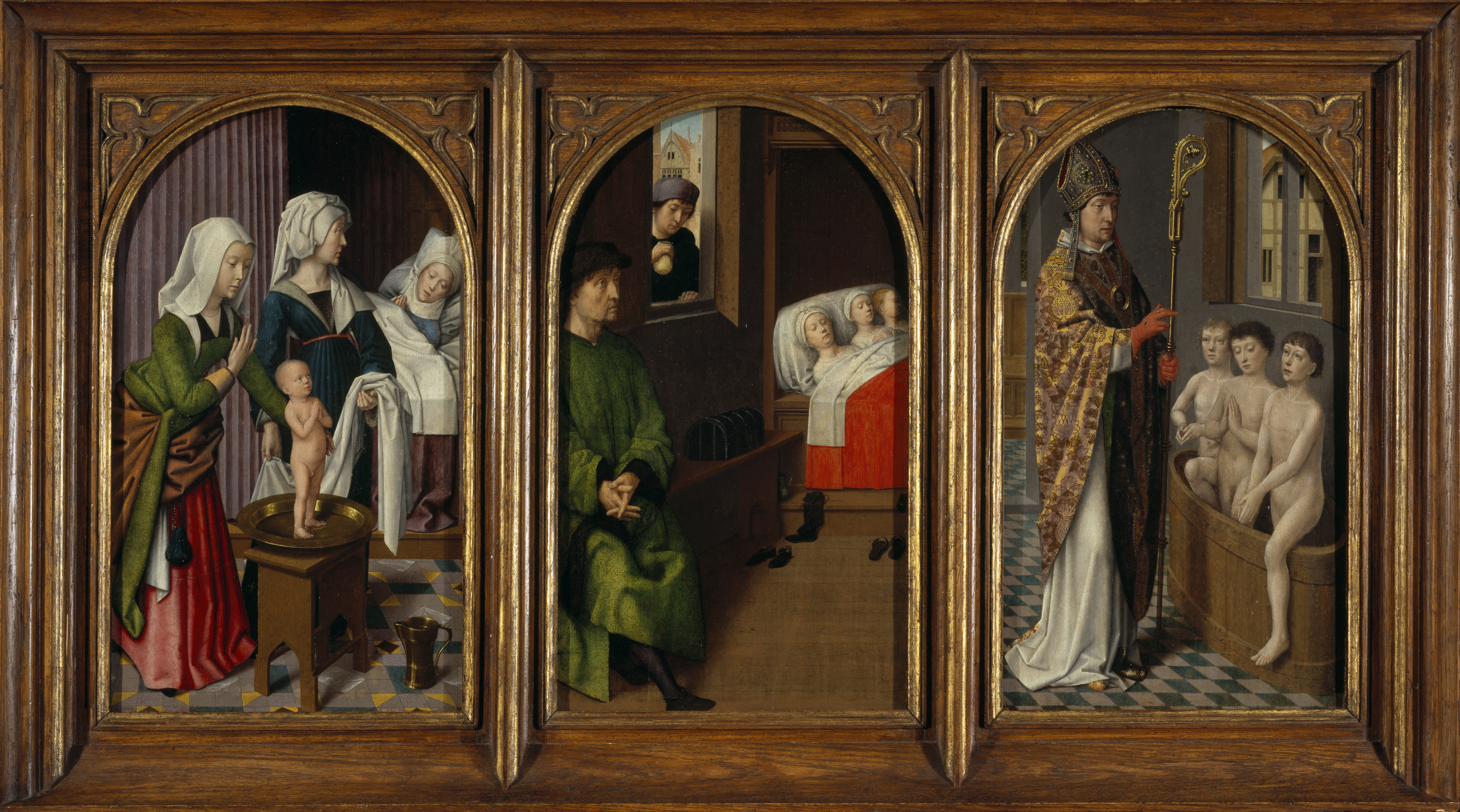
Three Legends of Saint Nicholas, c. 1500-1520, Scottish National Gallery

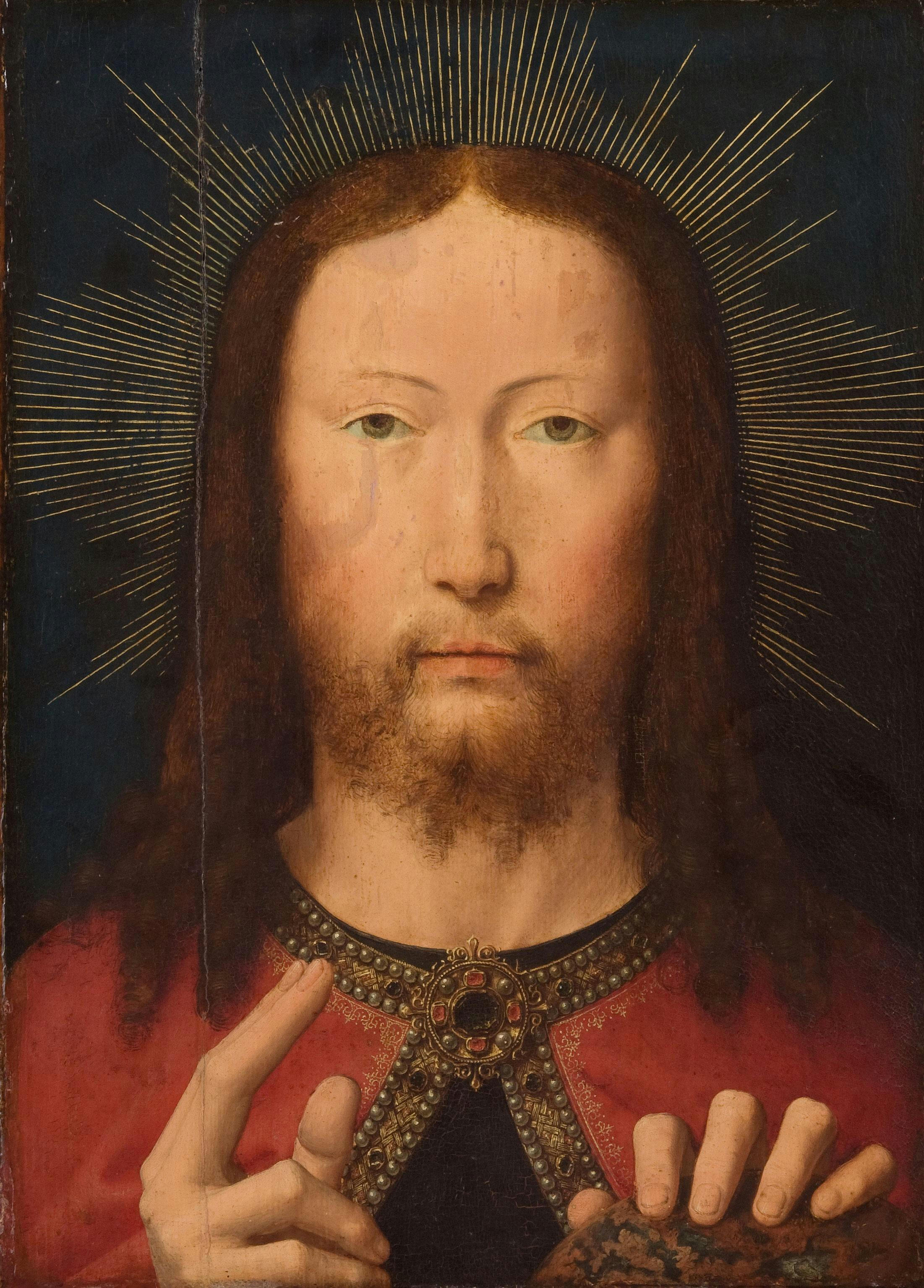
Salvator Mundi, c. 1500, Philadelphia Museum of Art

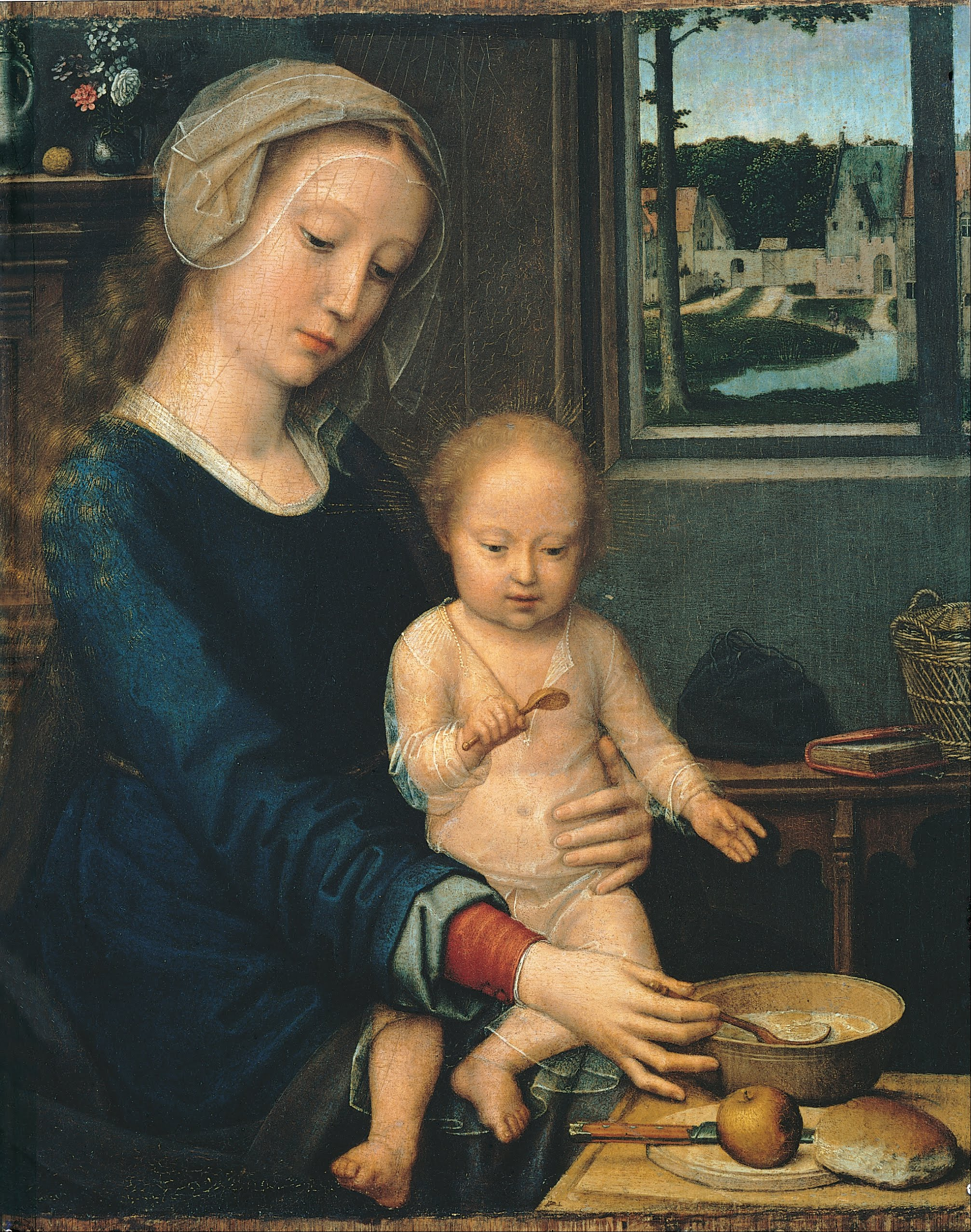
Madonna and Child with the Milk Soup, c. 1515. Oil on panel, 25 x 29 cm, Royal Museum of Fine Arts of Belgium

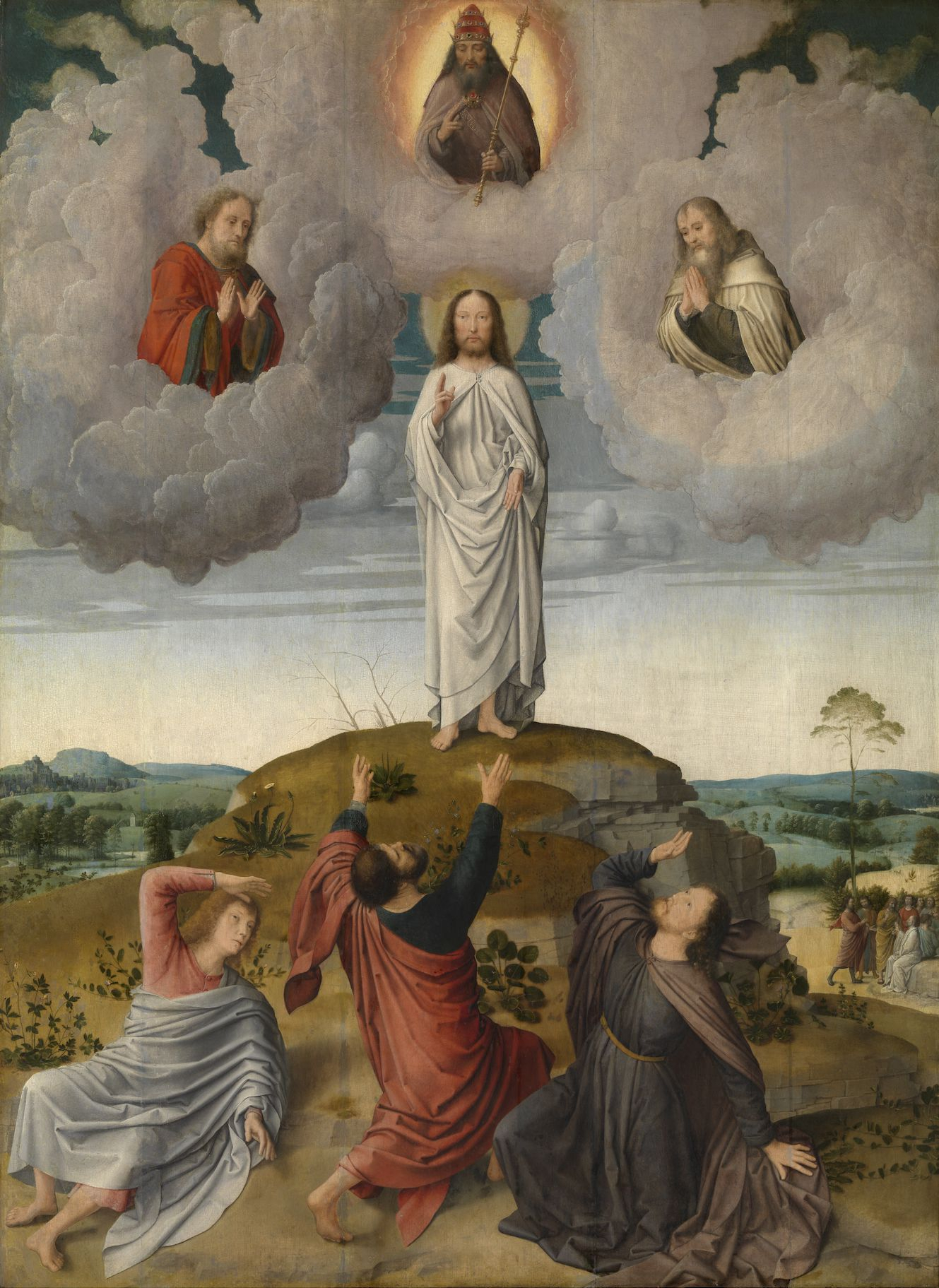
Transfiguration of Christ. Church of Our Lady, Bruges

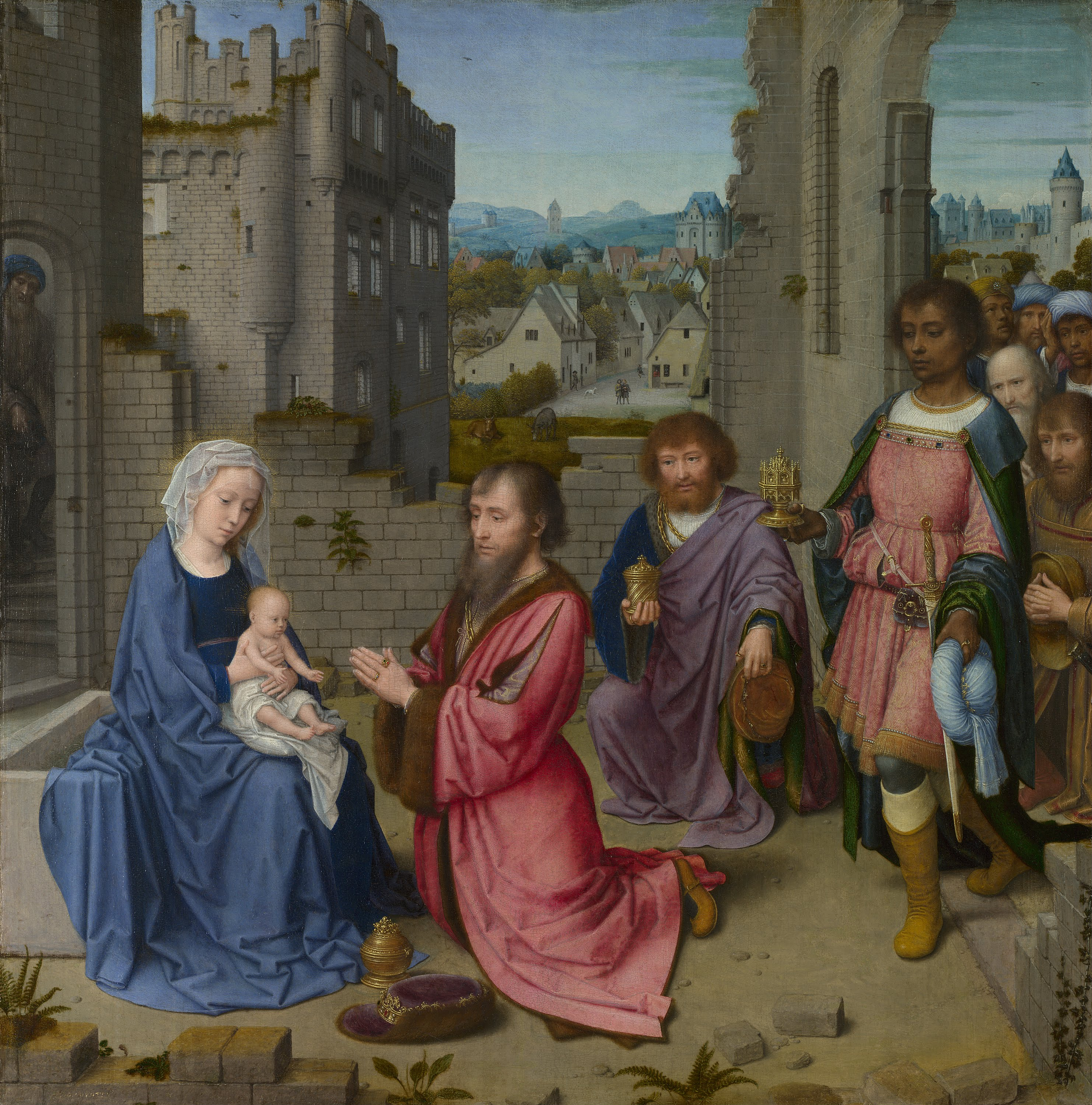
Adoration of the Kings, 1515–1523, National Gallery, London

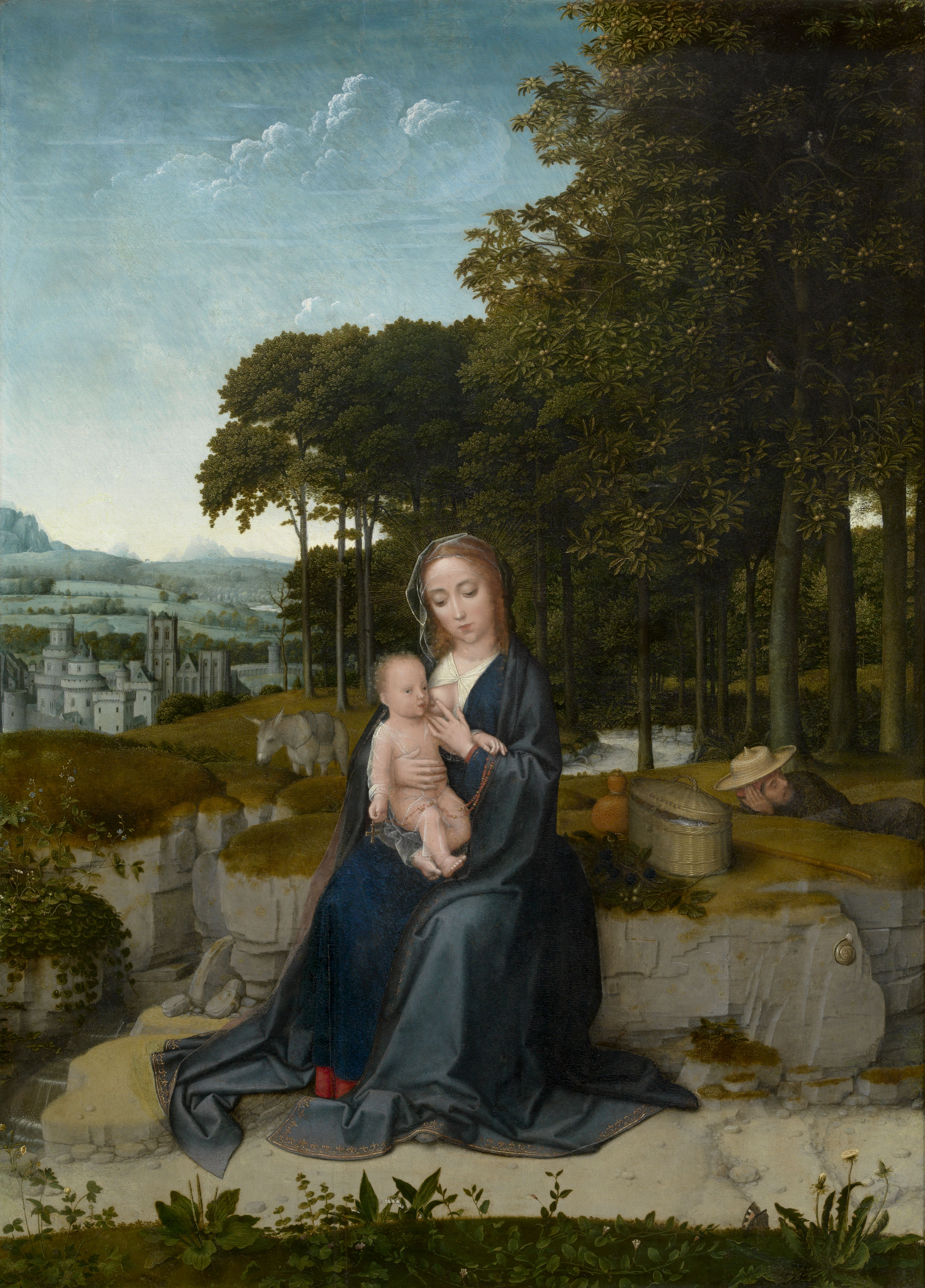
Rest on the Flight into Egypt, Gerard David, c. 1515. Royal Museum of Fine Arts Antwerp

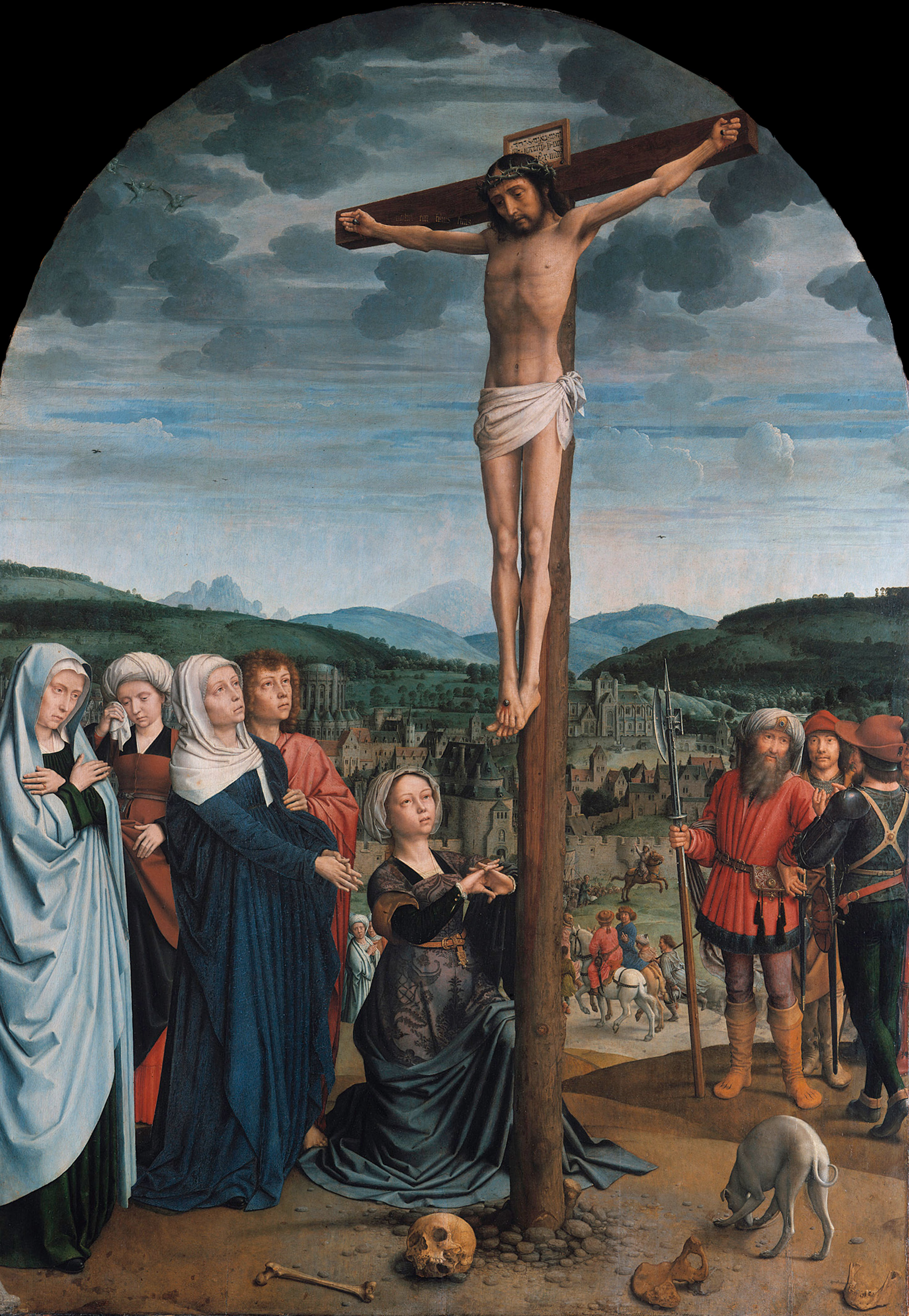
Christ on the Cross, 1480–85, Royal Museum of Fine Arts Antwerp

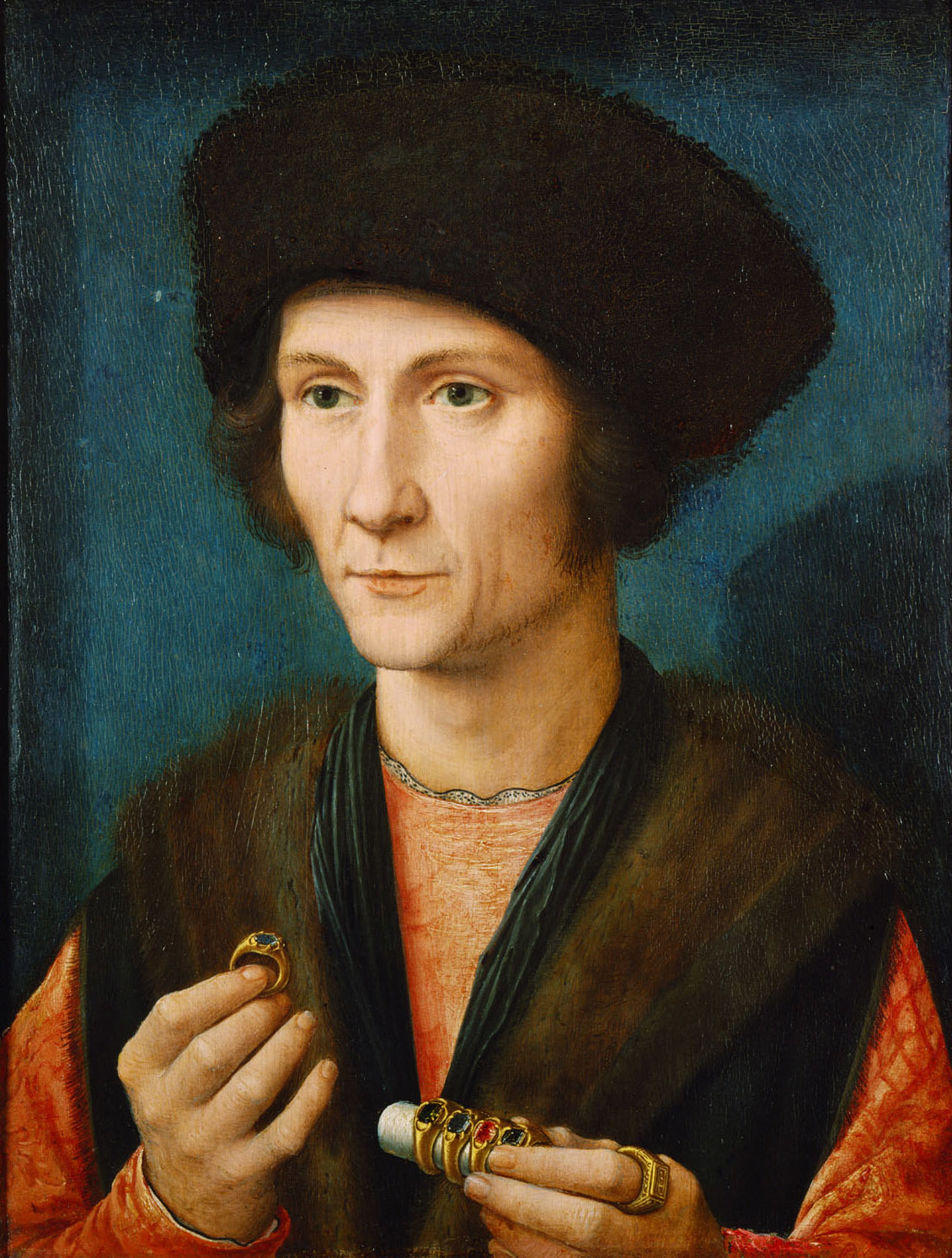
Portrait of a Goldsmith, 1500s, Kunsthistorisches Museum
