= Claeissens =

Claeissens, also spelled Claessens or Claeissins is a Dutch language surname. It may refer to:

- Antoon Claeissens (c.1536–1613), a Flemish painter
- Gillis Claeissens (1526–1605), a Flemish painter
- Pieter Claeissens the Elder (1500–1576), a Flemish painter
- Pieter Claeissens the Younger (c. 1535–1623), a Flemish painter
