= Sisamnes =

6th-century BC Persian judge

The Judgment of Cambyses by Gerard David

Sisamnes was, according to Herodotus's Histories, book 5, chapter 25, a corrupt royal judge active in the Persian empire during the reign of Cambyses II of Persia. When Cambyses learned that Sisamnes had accepted a bribe to influence a verdict, he had him promptly arrested and sentenced him to be flayed alive. He had the skin of the flayed Sisamnes cut into leather strips. Cambyses then appointed Otanes, the son of the condemned Sisamnes, as his father's judicial successor. In order to remind Otanes what happens to corrupt judges and not forget the importance of judicial integrity, Cambyses ordered that the new judge's chair be draped in the leather strips made from the skin of the flayed Sisamnes. Otanes later became a satrap in Ionia. Cambyses warned Otanes to continually keep in mind the source of the leather of the chair upon which he would be seated to deliberate and deliver his judgment. The story was also referred to by the first century Latin author Valerius Maximus in his Factorum ac dictorum memorabilium libri IX (The nine books of memorable deeds and sayings). Whereas in Herodotus' version Sisamnes' skin is cut into strips, Maximus has the skin stretched across the chair.

== Interpretation ==
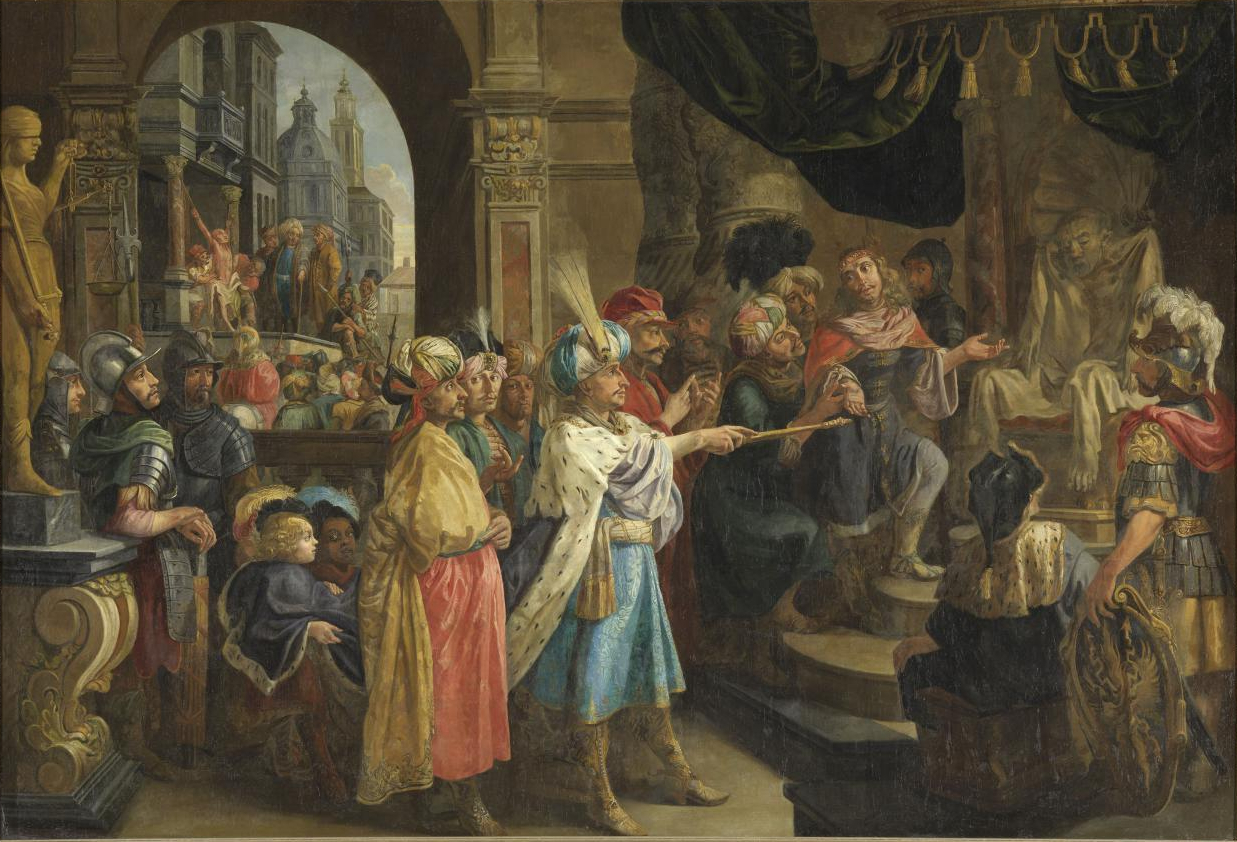
The judgement of Cambyses, by Vigor Boucquet

In the original story Herodotus may have wanted to suggest that King Cambyses had gone mad. Valerius Maximus included the story of King Cambyses in a chapter on the severity of foreigners. In the Middle Ages and the Renaissance period, images of judges who were warned, restrained and punished by their kings were common. Cambyses' judgement was included in the Speculum Historiale of Vincent of Beauvais (died in 1264). The late 13th-century Flemish writer Jacob van Maerlant liberally translated the Speculum in Middle Dutch as Spiegel historiael (Mirror of History), thus providing the first recounting of the Cambyses story in the Dutch language. The story became increasingly associated with the concept of the impartial administration of justice. An inscription on a mid-sixteenth century German medal depicting the Cambyses story reads: "Cambyses maintained the law and administered it justly, as one can perceive here from the punishment."

The Renaissance seems to have reinterpreted the Cambyses story as an illustration of the need for a king to exert appropriate control over the judiciary. The sovereigns of that time may have found the story useful to remind the populace of their power or reminding their judges of the punishment that they could receive if they displeased them. That the depiction is particularly widespread in the 16th and 17th centuries is perhaps not coincidental, since the story emphasizes the power of the princes to appoint and depose judges at will. Another interpretation is that the depictions of Cambyses' judgement reflect the then common view that earthly justice is fallible while only divine justice dispensed by the Christian God can provide ultimate fairness.

== The judgment of Cambyses in art ==
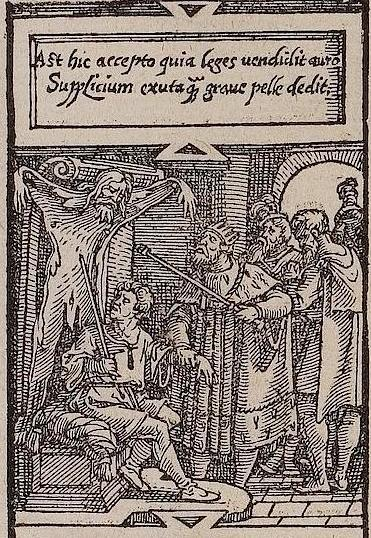
The Judgement of Cambyses by Hans Sebald Beham, 1542

The story of the corrupt Sisamnes inspired various Northern artists in the 15th to 17th centuries, including Gerard David, Antoon Claeissens, Joachim Wtewael, Martin Hermann Faber, Claes Jacobsz van der Heck, Jan Tengnagel, Dirck Vellert, and Peter Paul Rubens. Visual illustrations of the story first appeared in manuscripts and prints such as Hans Sebald Beham's The Judgement of Cambyses (1542) which was part of the frontispiece of Justinus Göbler's publication Der Gerichtlich Prozeß (The judicial process). It was later rendered in paintings, sculptures, and stained glass. Many of these artworks were commissioned by the civilian authorities to be hung in the places where in that period justice was dispensed, such as the aldermen's chambers of city halls or courts of justice. These depictions of the Sisamnes story served as examples of justice (in Latin exampla iustitiae) to the judges who could take them as examples or exhortation to perform their task with fairness and severity. Most of the depictions represent the moment at which Otanes takes his father's seat on which the skin of his father is draped while the king admonishes him standing in front of him. Some depictions omit Cambyses and concentrate solely on Otanes as an impartial judge.

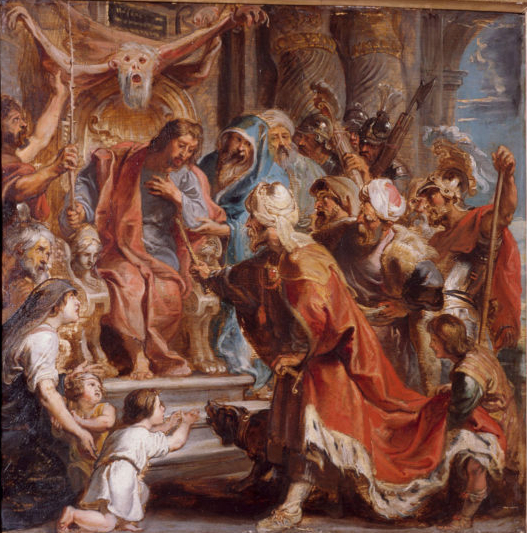
The Judgment of Cambyses by Rubens or workshop of Rubens

Gerard David was one of the first Northern artists to take Sisamnes' fate as the subject of his diptych The Judgement of Cambyses which he completed in 1498. It was commissioned by the aldermen of Bruges to be hung in the aldermen's chamber in the Bruges City Hall. The left panel of the diptych called The Arrest of Sisamnes shows In the background Sisamnes accepting a bribe while in the foreground king Cambyses passes judgement on the corrupt judge who is seated in his judge's chair. The right panel called The Flaying of Sisamnes depicts in graphic detail the judge being flayed alive with the King Cambyses along with members of the court and public looking on. In the background is a smaller scene showing the young judge sitting on his judge's chair which is covered in the skin of his father Sisamnes. David has placed the various scenes in a contemporary setting. The buildings visible in the background of the scenes are contemporary buildings in Bruges and the clothing worn by the figures gathered to witness Sisamnes' judgement is in the style worn by Flemish people at the time. Sisamnes himself is dressed in the red robe which was the official attire of judges in the period. By locating the scene in contemporary Flanders, David reinforced the relevance of the ancient story to the early modern viewer.

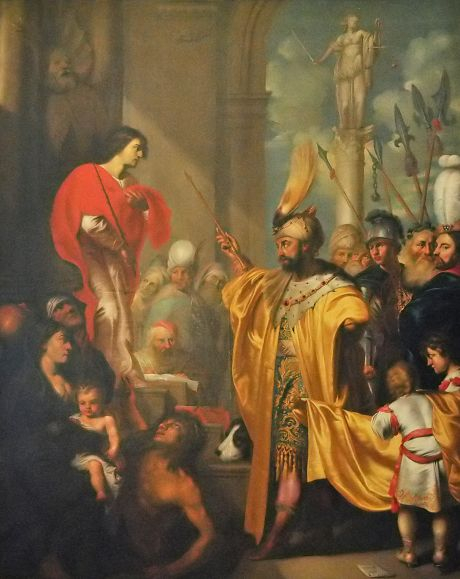
The Judgement of Cambyses by Isaac Isaacsz

The Bruges painter Antoon Claeissens took the left panel of David's diptych as the inspiration of his own rendering of The Judgment of Cambyses (second half of 16th century, Groeningemuseum, Bruges) as he concentrates on the depiction of the arrest of the corrupt judge while also showing the passing of the bribe to the judge in the background. This work formerly also hung in the City Hall of Bruges. The many figures appearing together with the king in the picture appear to be portraits of real persons, possibly members of the city council of Bruges. The Dutch publication Thronus Justitiae first published in 1606 contains 13 plates of justice scenes after designs by Joachim Wtewael. One depicts the Judgment of Cambyses. Martin Hermann Faber painted a version for the city hall of Emden in 1617 and Claes Jacobsz van der Heck did the same for the city hall of Alkmaar in 1620. Both works are similar and depict in the foreground the installation of Otanes and in the background the execution of Sisamnes. Another Dutch painter, Jan Tengnagel, created in 1619 a Judgment of Cambyses for the Amsterdam city hall (now in a private collection in The Hague) in which he reduced the number of figures to a minimum thus emphasizing the core interaction between the king and the newly appointed judge.

Rubens painted his version of the story after receiving a commission by the Brussels Council for the large sum of 3000 florins. Rubens completed the work between 1622 and 1626 after which it was hung in the court room of the Brussels Town Hall. It was destroyed during the infamous bombardment of Brussels by French troops from 13 to 15 August 1695. Several copies of the work have been preserved. Rubens shows the moment in which the son sits down on the judge's seat above which his father's skin hangs as a canopy. Rubens clearly follows the iconographic tradition of the story but gave it a Baroque touch. King Cambyses is shown in a dynamic pose holding his scepter and with his hand on his sword, clearly admonishing the new judge who bows his head in submission. At the feet of the king is a dog barking at Otanes. On the right of the king are a number of soldiers and bearded old men, possibly the king's counselors, whose presence further bolsters the authority of the just king. On the left a man, a woman and two children witnessing the scene are prostrating themselves in reverence for the king. The Dutch painter Isaac Isaacsz, who had worked in Antwerp, painted his own Judgment of Cambyses for the Harderwijk city hall (still in situ) which is clearly influenced by Rubens' effort.

The Flemish painter Vigor Boucquet was commissioned to paint a Judgment of Cambyses by the city magistrate of Nieuwpoort as a gift to the city in 1671. Due to its large dimensions, the painting (now kept in the Church of Our Lady in Nieuwpoort) must have made an overwhelming impression in the magistrates' court where it was hung originally. In his composition, Boucquet focuses on the scene where Cambyses shows the young judge to his chair with his sceptre. The chair is draped in his father's skin with the face of the father clearly recognisable. In the background we can see the flaying of the corrupt judge. At the far left of the composition is a statue of the blindfolded Justice with scales and sword, which emphasizes the role of the painting as an exemplum iustitiae.

== Gallery ==
Selected art works

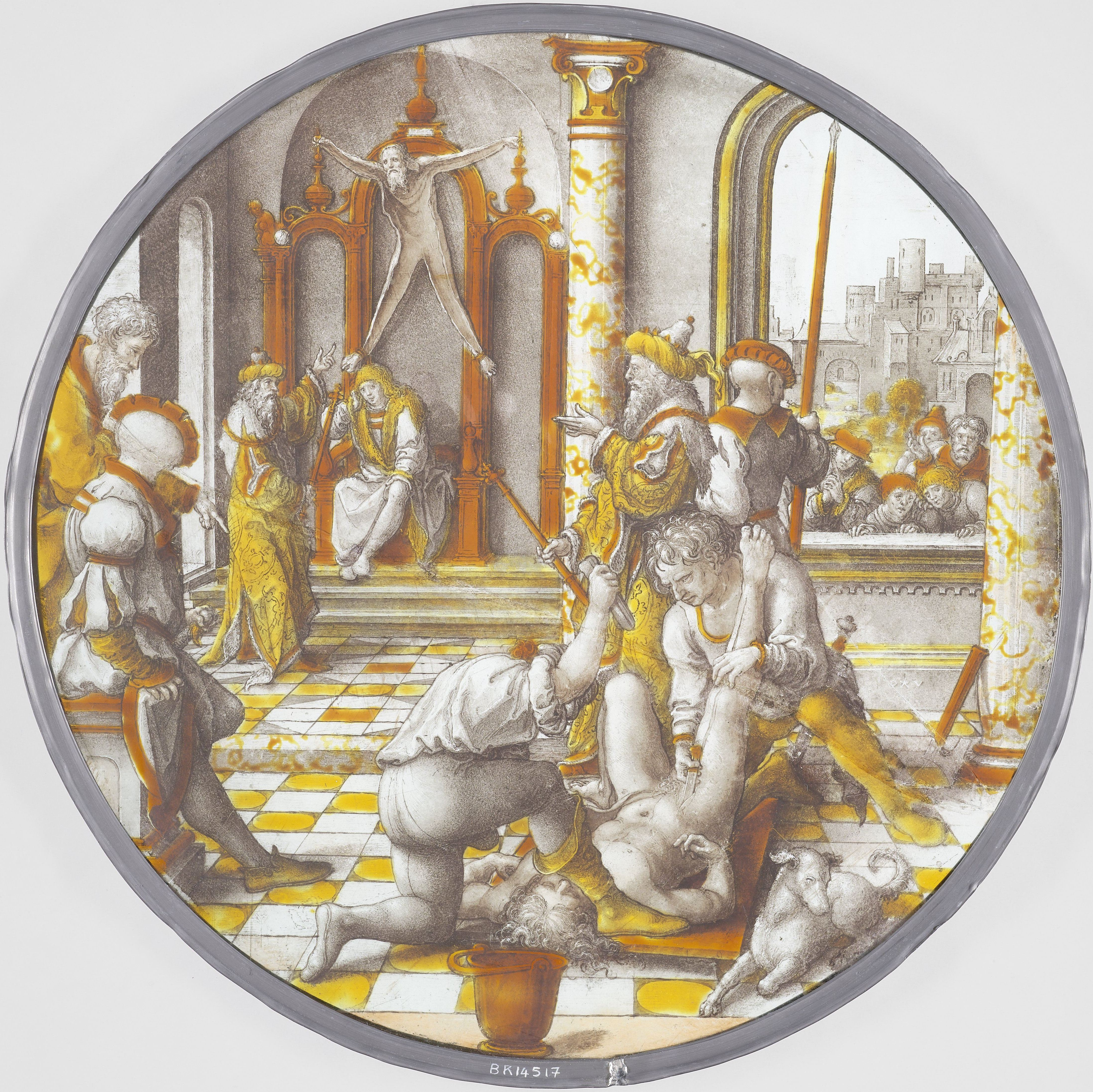
The Judgment of Cambyses. Stained glass, by Dirck Vellert, 1542

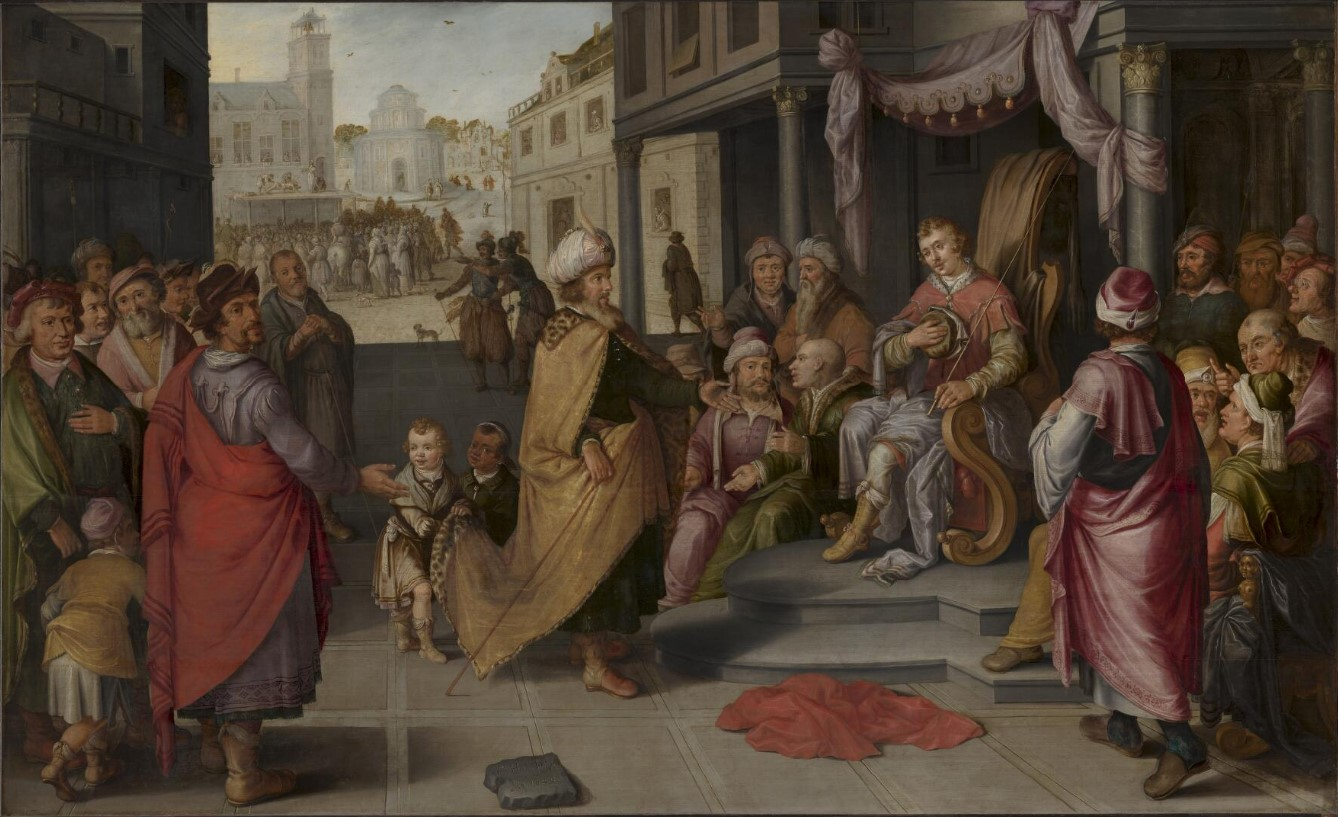
The Judgment of Cambyses by Claes Jacobsz van der Heck, 1620. Otanes takes his place on the seat with his father's skin hanging over the backrest. In front of him stands Cambyses. In the background, the flaying of Sisamnes is depicted.

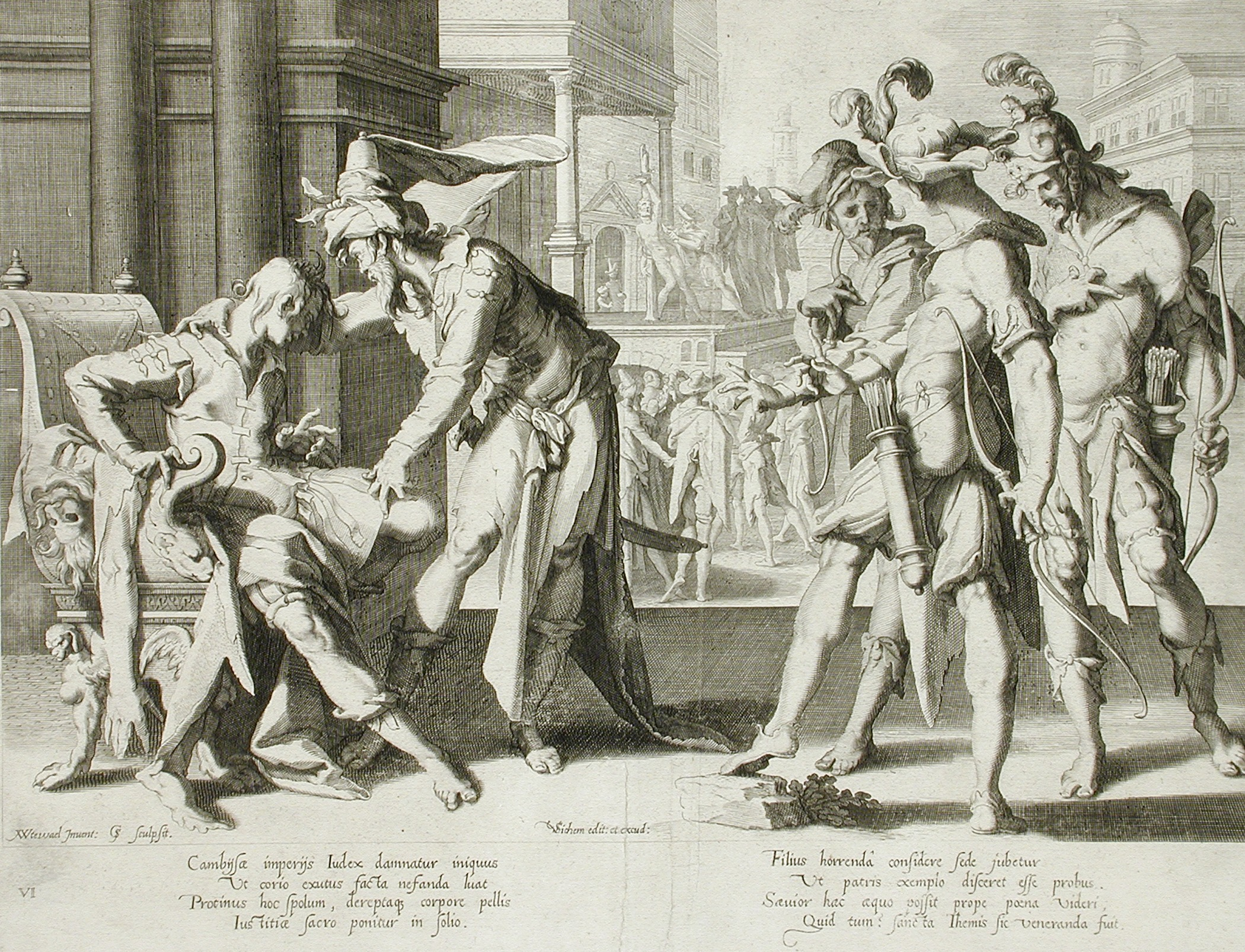
Cambyses commanding the flaying of judge Sisamnes, print engraved by Willem Isaacsz. van Swanenburg after design of Joachim Wtewael, 1607. Otanes is sitting down in the judge's chair draped in the skin of his father.
