= Pieter Claeissens =

Pieter Claeissens may refer to:

- Pieter Claeissens the Elder (1500–1576), Flemish painter
- Pieter Claeissens the Younger (c. 1535–1623), Flemish painter
