= Vigor Boucquet =

Flemish painter

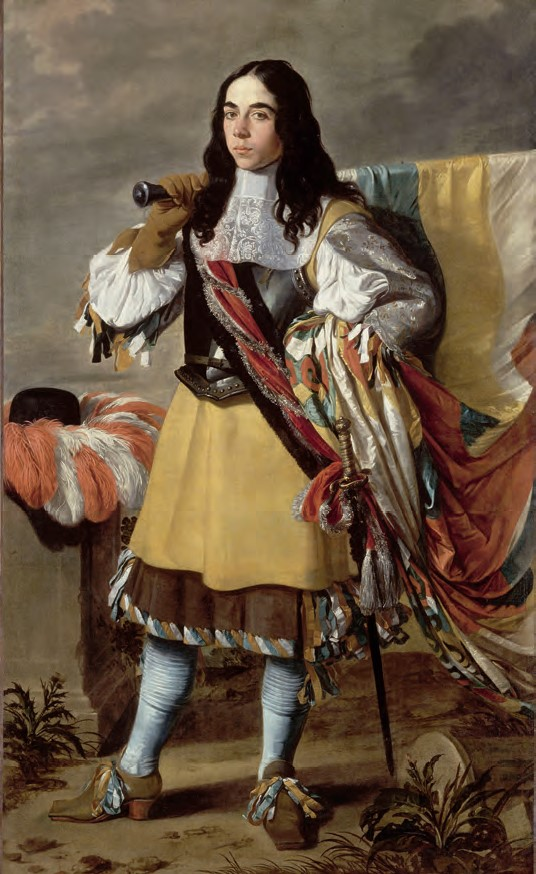
The Standard Bearer

Vigor Boucquet or Victor Boucquet (Veurne, 1619 – Veurne, 1677) was a Flemish painter known for his portraits and paintings of biblical subjects. Boucquet was mainly active in his native Veurne and its surroundings where he was in demand for altarpieces for the local churches and monasteries. Boucquet worked in the typical Flemish Baroque style of his time, with a tendency towards a somber realism.

== Life ==
Boucquet was born in Veurne, Flanders in 1619 as the son of Marcus Boucquet, a little known painter who was the city painter of Veurne. Vigor learned the painting craft from his father. While it has been speculated in the past that Boucquet may have visited Italy, there is no evidence that Boucquet did and he likely resided in his hometown his whole life. Boucquet is believed to have familiarized himself with new international developments through prints.

Boucquet received commissions to paint altarpieces for numerous churches and monasteries in the Westhoek region of Flanders which allowed him to make a good living. Boucquet was a member of the exclusive Sint-Sebastiaansgilde (Guild of Saint Sebastian) of Veurne and of the Jansenist-inspired Sodaliteit van de Gekruisigde Zaligmaker (Brotherhood of the Crucified Savior). He married Maria van der Haeghen.

When Spanish soldiers were quartered in Veurne to defend against the French invasions, Boucquet had the opportunity to portray some Spanish soldiers and officers. One of his most famous paintings The Standard Bearer (1664, Louvre) was painted around this time, although there is no agreement among art historians on the identity of the sitter and whether he was a Spanish soldier.

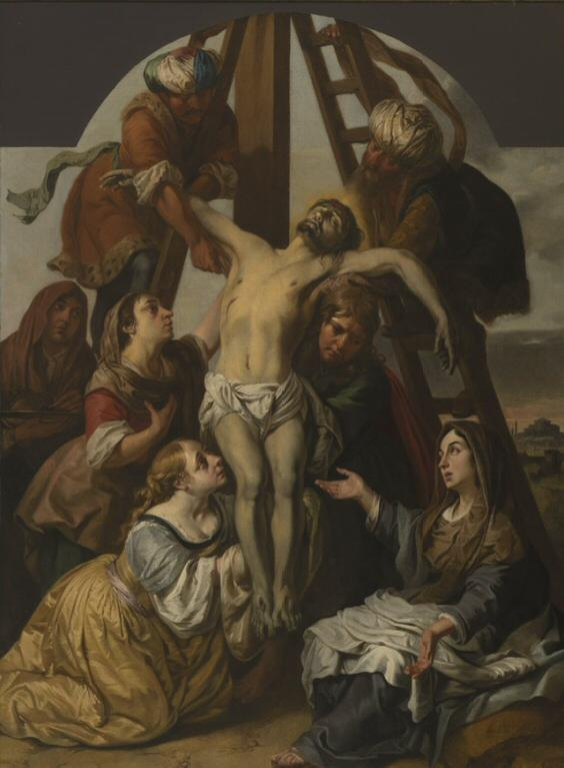
The descent from the Cross

Boucquet died in his native Veurne on 11 February 1677. His wife survived Boucquet and died on 22 May 1701.

== Work ==
Boucquet painted biblical and historical subjects as well as portraits. Boucquet's works are found in various churches of the towns near Veurne, including in Nieuwpoort, Alveringem, Lo-Reninge, Ypres and Ostend. Many of his religious paintings and portraits that were kept in public buildings were destroyed during the heavy battles waged in this part of Flanders during World War I. As a painter Boucquet had recognized but limited talents. He is appreciated for his palette and his skill in realistically depicting clothing and fabrics. His anatomical depiction of the human body is sometimes inaccurate and the faces of his figures often look similar.

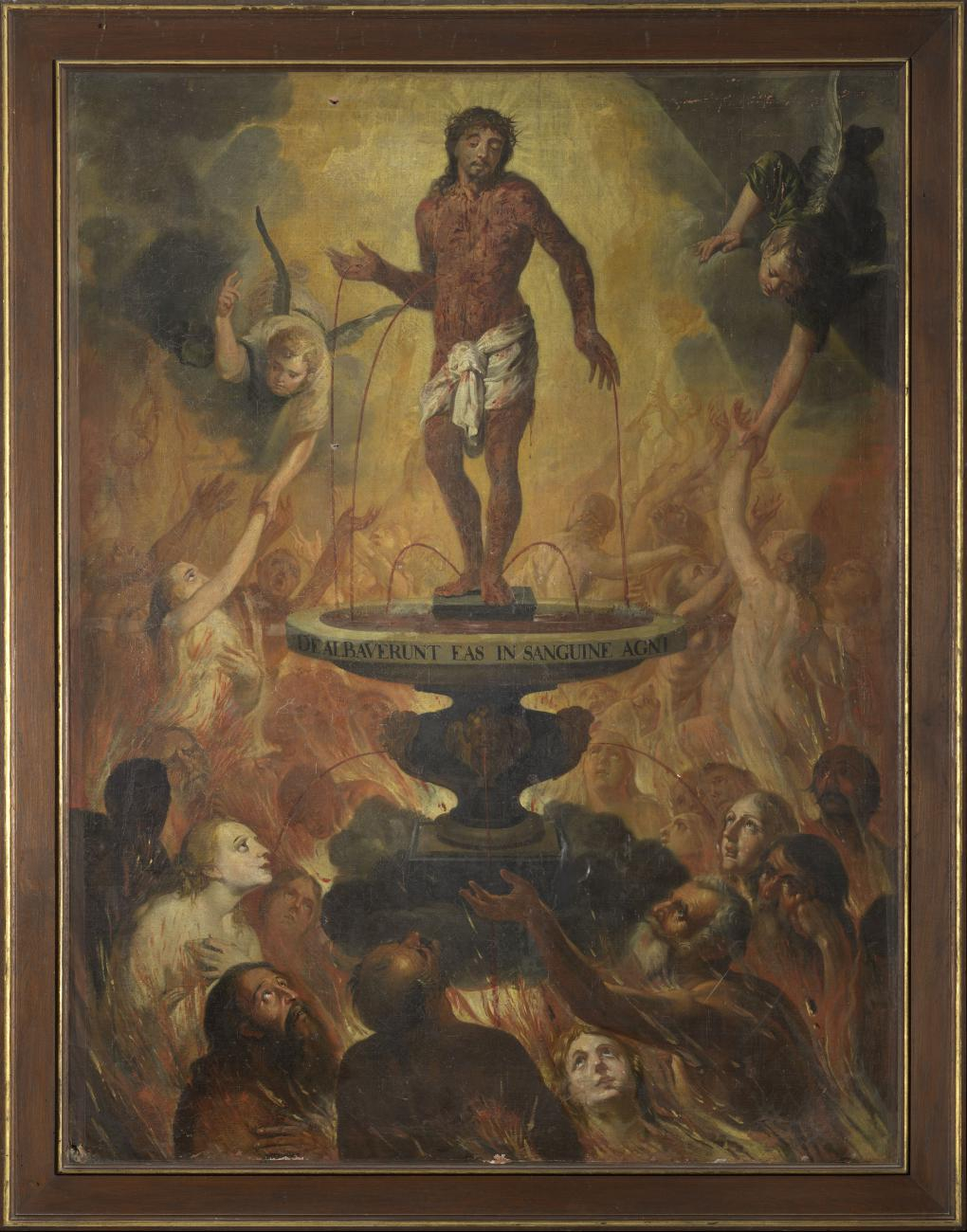
They cleaned their souls in the blood of Christ

Boucquet had a refined technique which he put to use in his portraits. One of his most famous paintings The Standard Bearer (1664, Louvre) is signed 'Vigor Boucquet' and dated 1664. The work is traditionally believed to represent a person in military uniform. The standing figure holds over his shoulder a multicolored flag. On his armor, crossed by a red scarf fringed with gold, is spread a broad lace collar. His tunic of yellow leather covers a skirt in brown violet. The sleeves of his shirt are finely pleated. He wears blue stockings and a hat with white feathers is placed on a pedestal next to him. The swarthy complexion of the face, framed by long black hair, seems to denote a Spaniard. The countess of Comminges-Guitaud, who donated the painting to the Louvre, had bought the painting in Spain, which would point again to a Spanish sitter. There is, however, no firm evidence that the depicted person is a Spaniard garrisoned in Veurne. It is very well possible that the portrait depicts a member of a local civic guard or a company of archers.

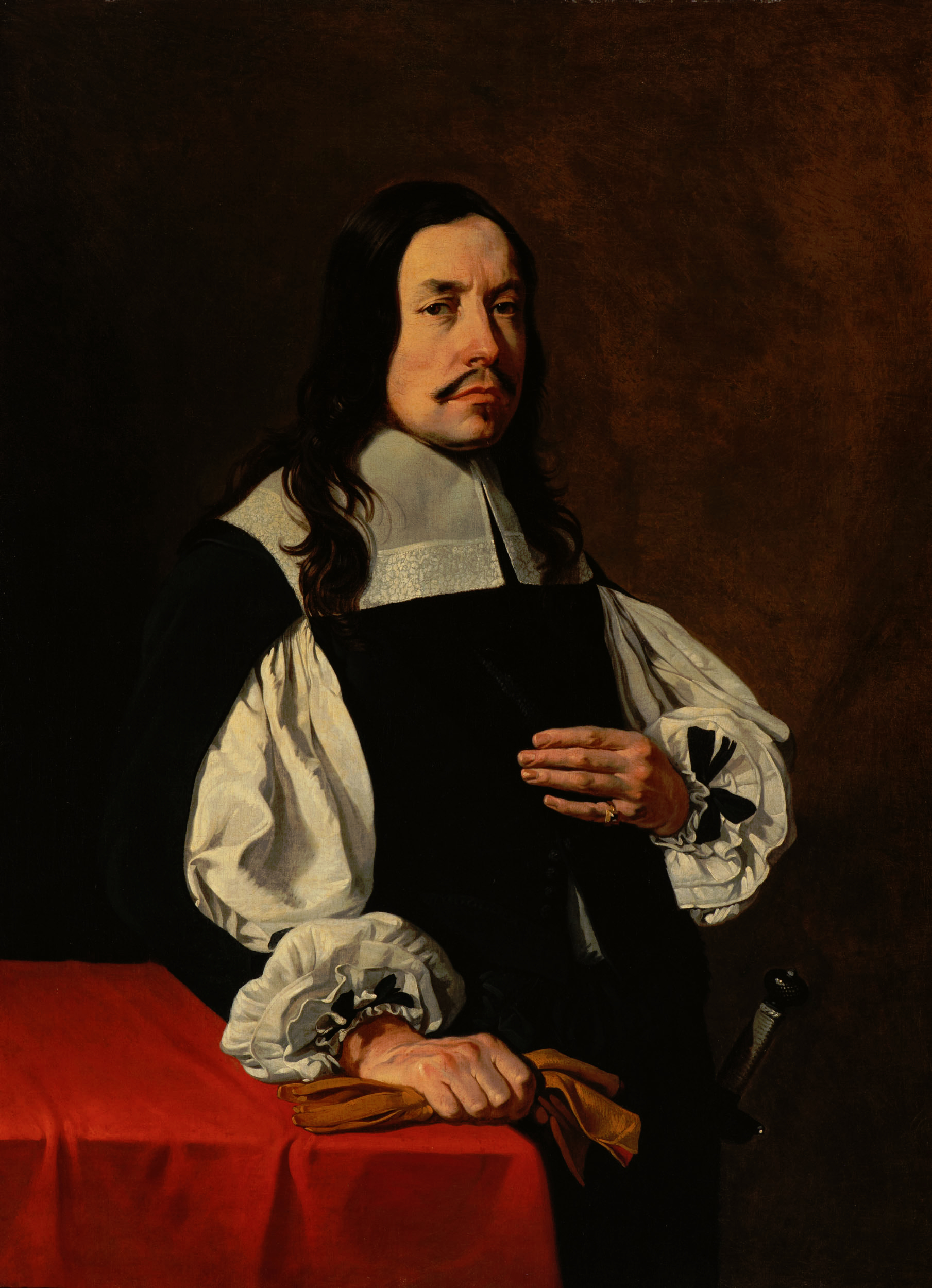
Portrait of a man

In the Church of Saint Walpurga of Veurne hangs his painting entitled They cleaned their souls in the blood of Christ. This canvas, painted around 1663, was intended for the altar of the Broederschap der Overledene Zielen in het Vageveur (Brotherhood of the Dead Souls in Purgatory), which had just been founded by pastor Jacob de Wieu. It shows purgatory with people amongst the flames begging for God's mercy for their souls. Christ is shown standing on a fountain-like elevation with blood pouring out of his wounds. In the foreground, two angels are lifting two female figures out of the pool of fire showing how Christ's sacrificed blood saves the souls. The Latin words "de albaverunt eas in sanguine agni" (They cleaned their souls in the blood of the lamb) are written on the side of the elevation on which Christ is standing. For this church Boucquet also painted a Martyrdom of Saint Sebastian. The Saint Nicolas Church in Veurne also holds a Martyrdom of Saint Sebastian. The work was commissioned by the Sint-Sebastiaans hand bow guild of Veurne for the Saint Sebastian altar in this Church.

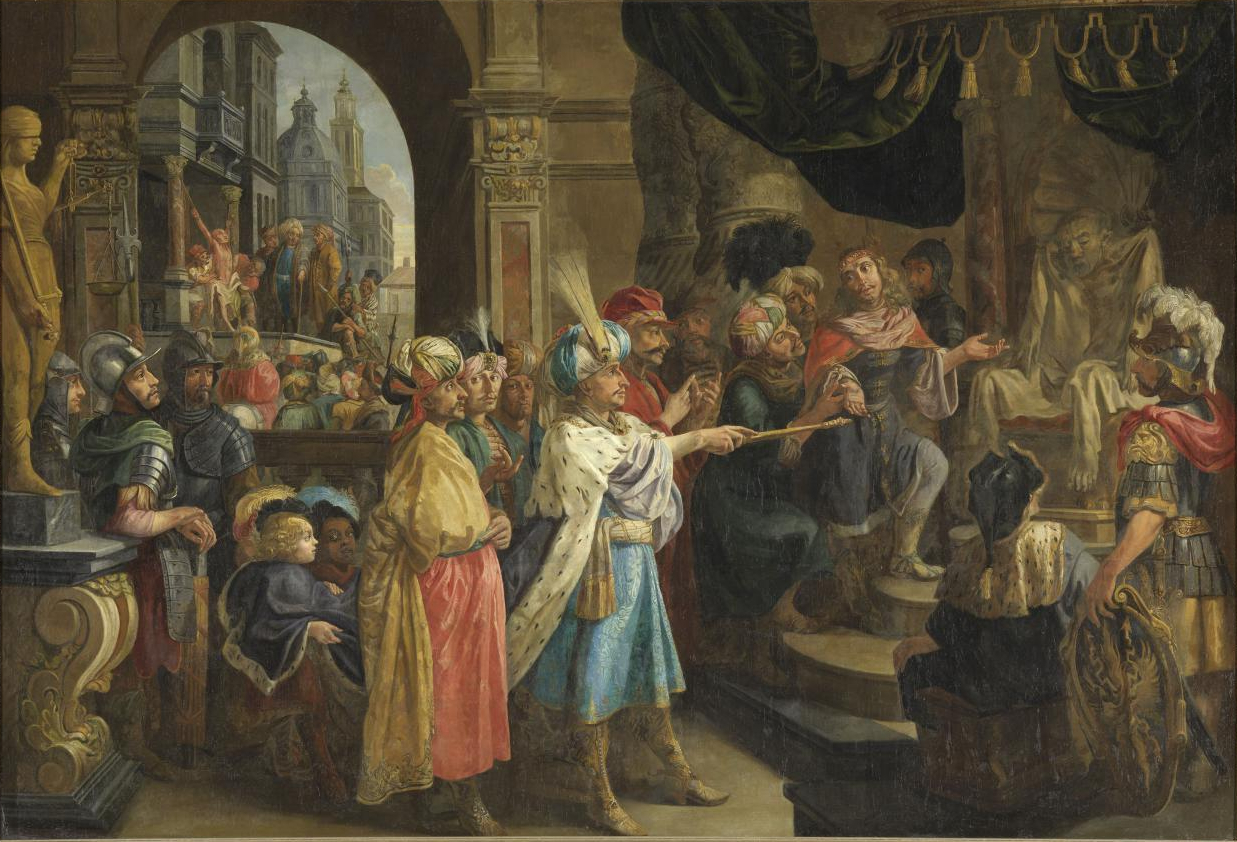
The judgement of Cambyses

One of Boucquet's most important history paintings is The Judgment of Cambyses. It was commissioned by the city magistrate of Nieuwpoort as a gift to the city in 1671. Due to its large dimensions it must have made an overwhelming impression in the magistrates' court where it was hung originally. The painting is inspired by the story of the judgment of Cambyses as recounted by the Greek historian Herodotus in book V of the Histories written in 430 BC. The Histories describes the history of the Persian empire and the Persian kings. The Cambyses in the painting is king Cambyses II, who ruled from 530 to 523 BC. According to Herodotus, when Cambyses learned that the royal judge Sisamnes had accepted a bribe, he had him promptly arrested and sentenced him to be flayed alive. Cambyses then appointed Otanes, son of the condemned Sisamnes, as his father's replacement. In order to remind the son of what happens to corrupt judges, Cambyses ordered that the new judge's chair be draped in the skin of the flayed Sisamnes so that he should not forget the importance of judicial integrity. The story of the corrupt Sisamnes inspired various Northern painters, including Gerard David, Antoon Claeissens, Claes Jacobsz van der Heck, Martin Hermann Faber, Joachim Wtewael and Rubens. David painted a diptych, in which he tells the four parts of the story. In the background of the first panel Sisamnes accepts a bribe while the main scene in the foreground shows the judge's sentencing. The foreground of the second panel shows the flaying of the judge while the background depicts the young judge sitting on his judge's chair which is covered in the skin of his father Sisamnes. In his composition, Boucquet focuses on the scene where Cambyses shows the young judge to his chair with his sceptre. The chair is draped in his father's skin with the face of the father clearly recognisable. In the background we can see the flaying of the corrupt judge. At the far left of the composition is a statue of the blindfolded Justice with scales and sword.
