= The Judgement of Cambyses =

Painting by Gerard David

- Artist: Gerard David
- Year: 1498
- Type: Oil on oak panel
- Dimensions: 182.3 cm × 318.6 cm (71.8 in × 125.4 in)
- Location: Groeninge Museum, Bruges, Belgium

The Judgement of Cambyses is an oil-on-wood diptych by Early Netherlandish artist Gerard David, depicting the arrest and flaying of the corrupt Persian judge Sisamnes on the order of Cambyses, based on Herodotus' Histories. The diptych was commissioned in 1487/1488 by the municipal authorities of Bruges which requested a series of panels for the deputy burgomaster's room in the town hall.

The diptych was painted on oak panels and was first mentioned in the Bruges' archives as The Last Judgement. It was used by the town burghers to encourage honesty among the magistrates and as a symbolic public apology for the imprisonment of Maximilian I in Bruges in 1488. The top right corner of the flaying scene features Sisamnes' son dispensing justice from his father's chair, now draped with the flayed skin.

It is one of the few works by David that is not based on traditional religious themes.

There are also other paintings with the same subject, such as that by Dirck Vellert from 1542.

== Usage in protests ==
David's The Judgement of Cambyses was used in August 2012 by the supporters of Yulia Timoshenko when they showed the reproduction of the work to the judge who was reviewing her case. In November of the same year two activists showed the reproduction of The Judgement of Cambyses to the judge Andrey Fedin, who convicted Maxim Luzyanin, involved in the Bolotnaya Square case.
