= Antoon Claeissens =

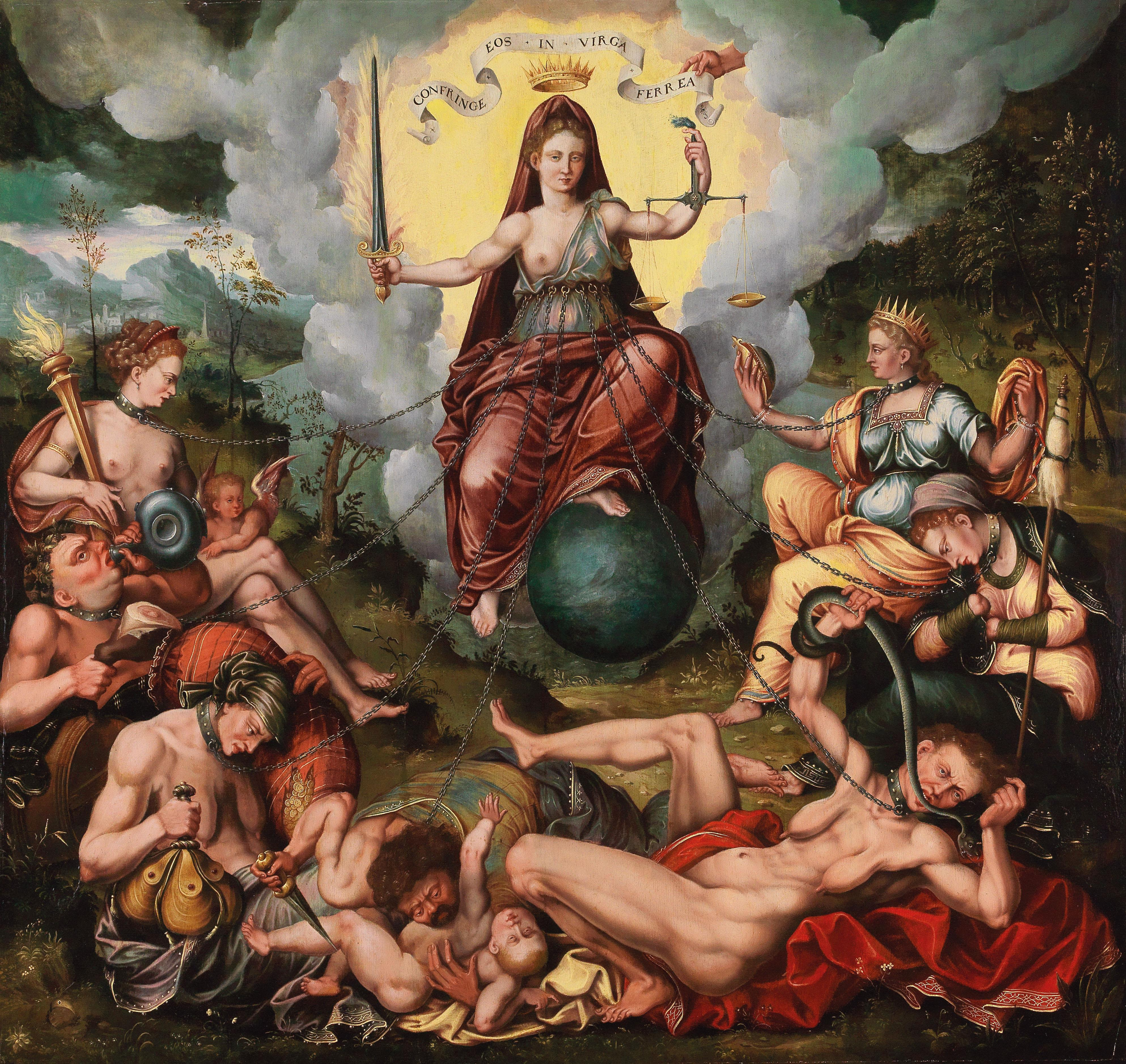
Justitia vanquishes the Seven Capital Sins

Antoon, Antonius or Anthuenis Claeissens, Claessens, or Claeissins (c.1536 – 18 January 1613) was a Flemish painter. His subjects were historical and allegorical scenes and portraits. He was a member of the Claeissens family of painters which played an important role in the art world in Bruges in the 16th century.

== Life ==
Antoon Claeissens was born in Bruges as the third son of Pieter Claeissens the Elder and Marie Meese. His father was a history painter and portraitist and his grandfather Alard Claeissens was also a painter. Antoon's brothers Gillis (1526-1605) and Pieter (c. 1535–1623) both became painters while a third brother Ambrosius was a master goldsmith. Antoon became a pupil of Pieter Pourbus, a leading history and portrait painter active in Bruges. Both Antoon and his brothers Gillis and Pieter enjoyed the financial support of their father before they became artists in their own right. They worked closely together in the father's workshop, which has made identification of the authorship of works difficult.

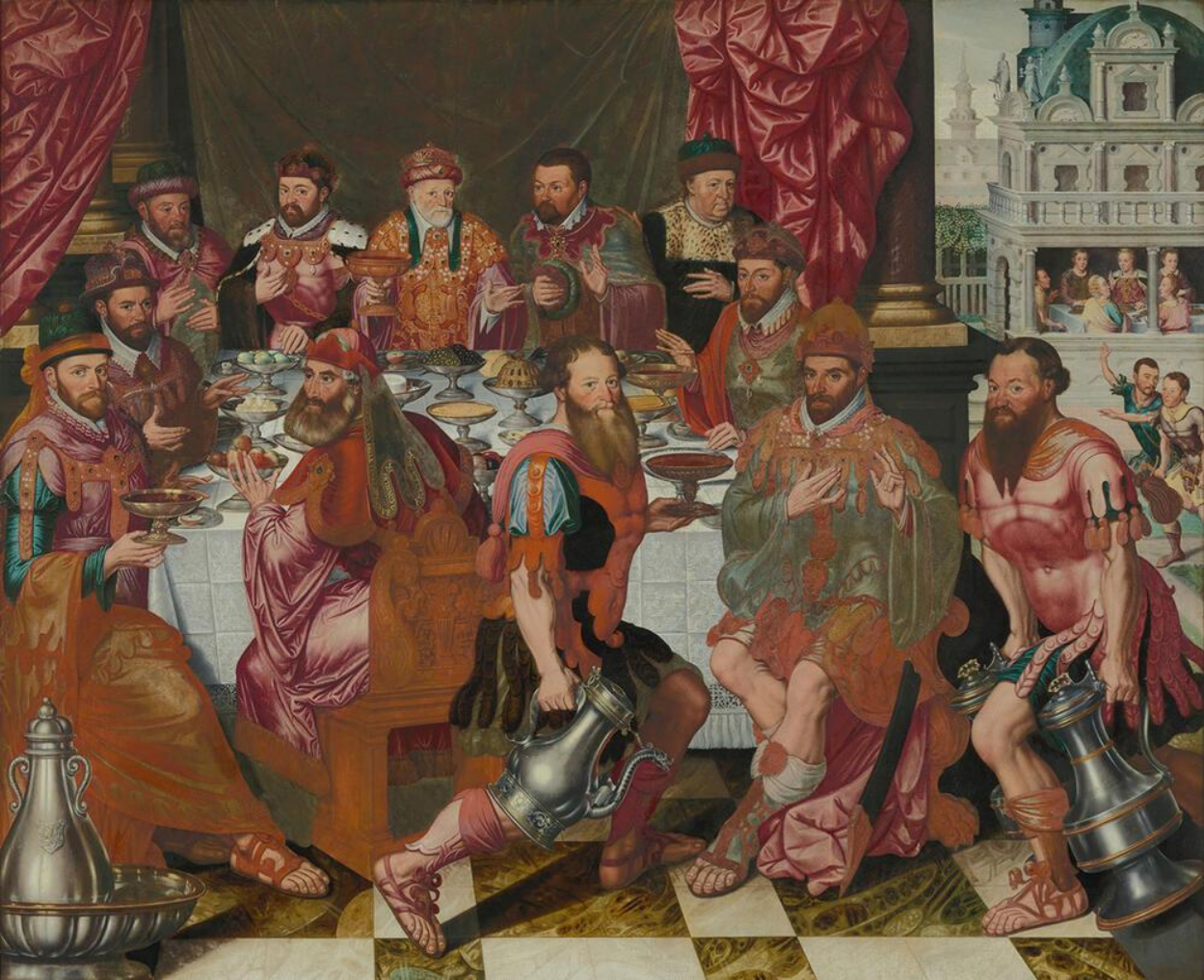
Banquet of the City Officials of Bruges in 1574

The Claeissens family workshop gained a monopolistic grip on official painting commissions in Bruges with their enormous output in the late 16th century. Antoon left the family business possible starting from 1573 at the latest. In 1575 he entered the Bruges Guild of Saint Luke. He and his brother Pieter took a leading role in the administration of the local Guild. They almost alternated in the positions of dean and finder of the Guild. Antoon was the Guild's dean in 1586, 1590, and 1601. After the death of their father in 1576, the brothers went their separate ways. Gillis took over the family workshop and bought out his mother and brothers. Pieter the Younger opened his own workshop in Bruges. Antoon was then already an independent master with his own workshop.

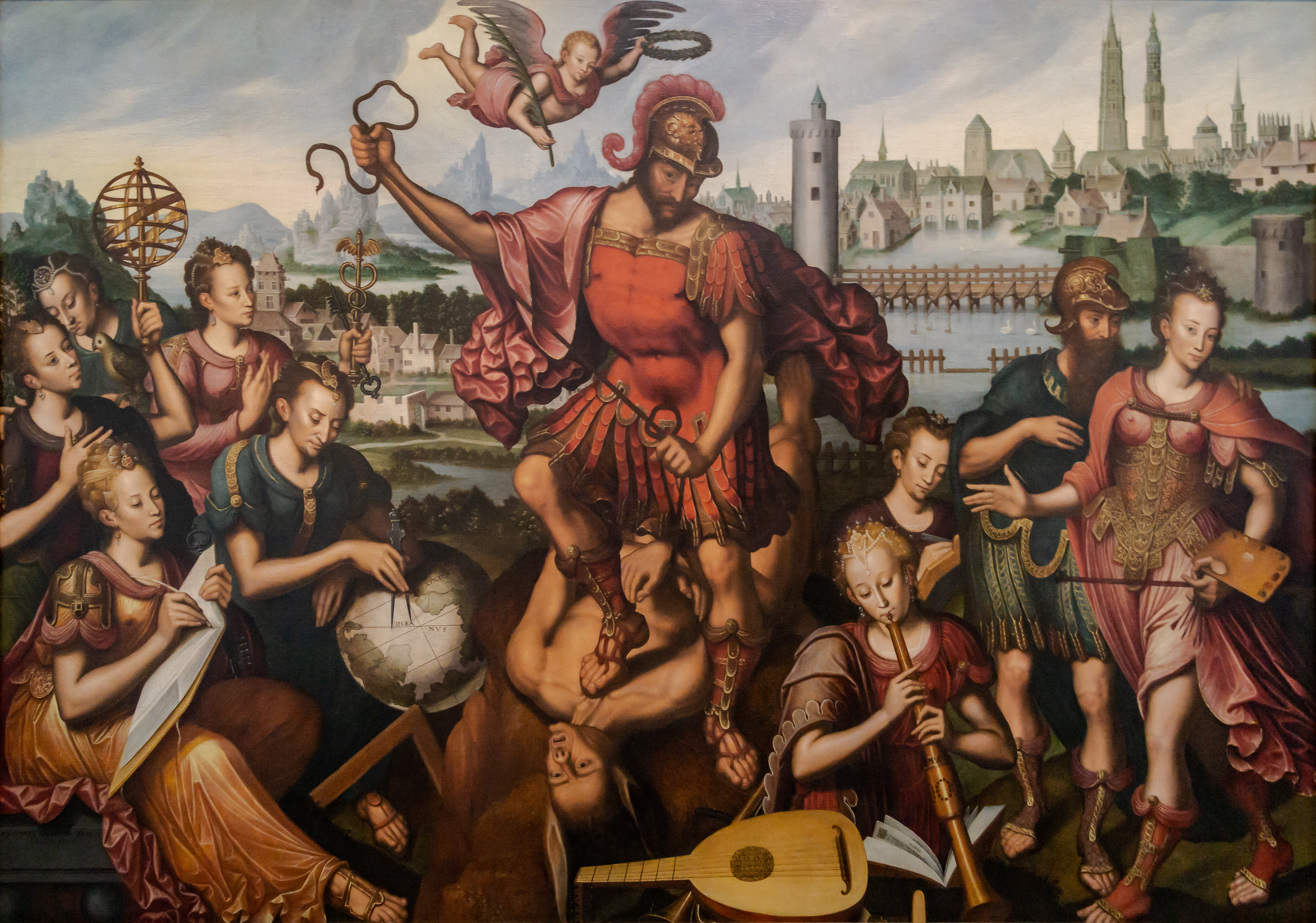
Mars, surrounded by the Arts and Sciences, vanquishes Ignorance

He was the city painter of Bruges from 1570 to 1581, after which he was succeeded in this post by his brother Pieter. After the death of Antoon's master Pourbus in 1584, Antoon and his brother Pieter became the leading painters in Bruges with many commissions to restore or replace the religious artworks which had been destroyed or damaged during the iconoclasm of the Beeldenstorm. The brothers received payments from the six parish churches of Bruges to coordinate decoration works, restore paintings and create new paintings. Antoon was responsible for works in the Saint Gillis Church and the Church of Our Lady while Pieter worked for the Saint Salvator Church (now the St. Salvator's Cathedral). The brothers shared the work in St. Walburga Church, St. James's Church and St. Donatian's Cathedral.

His son Pieter Antonius was dean of the Bruges Guild of St. Luke in 1607, and died in 1608.

Antoon Claeissens was buried on 18 January 1613 in his hometown.

== Work ==
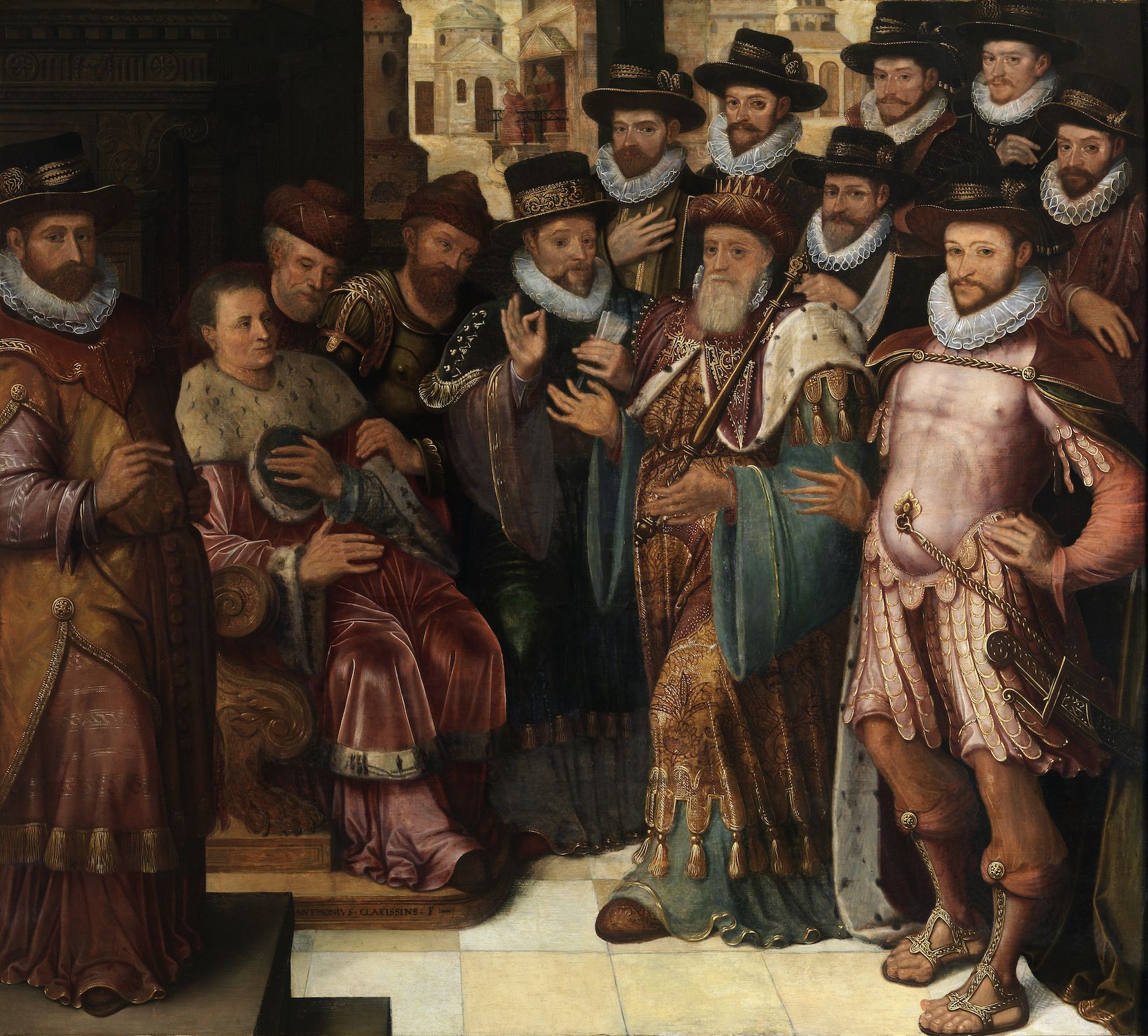
The Judgment of Cambyses

Claeissens painted historical and allegorical subjects, and portraits. As the city painter of Bruges he made various works for the city, some of which are still in the Bruges city hall. An example is the painting referred to as Mars, surrounded by the Arts and Sciences, vanquishes Ignorance (dated 1605, now in the Groeningemuseum). Its original title is not known and its meaning is contested among art historians. The city shown in the background of the canvas is Bruges. In the center, a man wearing antique armor has his right foot on a lying creature with donkey ears. He is surrounded by seven women engaged in various activities (taking measurements on a globe, playing the flute, writing in a book or on a slate...). To the right, an eighth woman, carrying a painter's palette and a hand rest is lead towards the group by another man in armor. The women in the picture appear to personify the liberal arts, which were the disciplines taught in medieval schools and universities. The eight women personifies painting and the aspiration of the art of painting to take a place among the prestigious group of seven liberal arts. The theme is frequent in the Low Countries in the 16th and 17th centuries. Whereas in contemporary compositions of the seven liberal arts, the goddess Minerva takes centre stage, this position is here taken by a male figure. If it is Mars, the god of war, then his role is here reversed from traditional depictions which see him as a threat to, rather than a protector of, the arts and crafts. These contradictions have given rise to other hypotheses. One hypothesis holds that the work conceals a political meaning and evokes the triumph over Protestantism", symbolized by the donkey-eared figure which represents Ignorance.

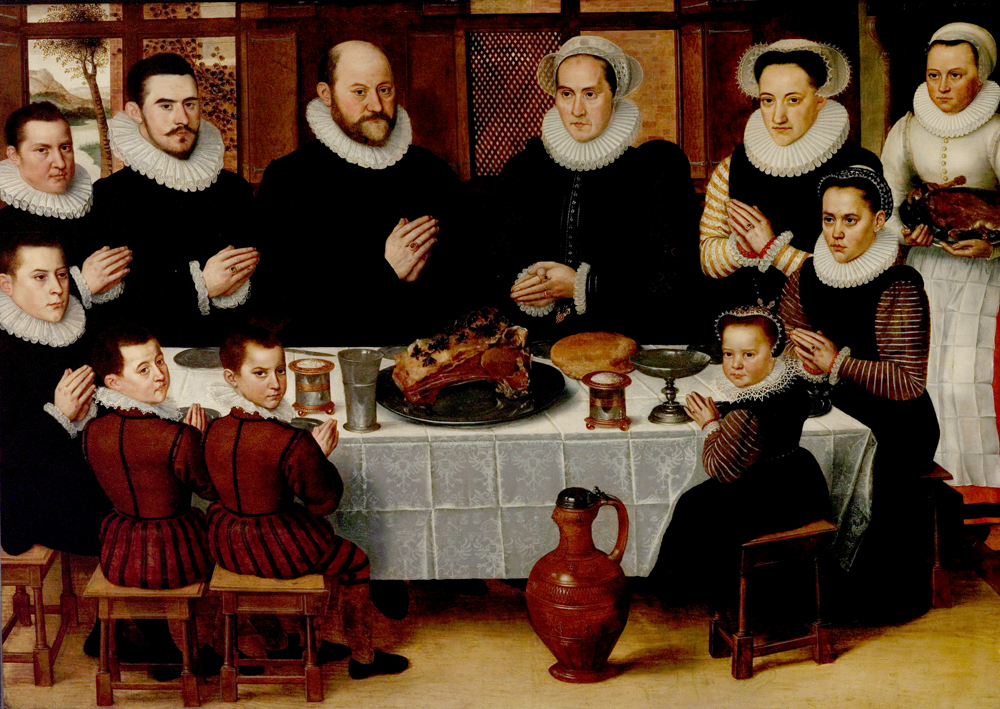
A Family Saying Grace before a Meal

Claeissens painted a number of group portraits. In the Bruges city hall hangs a Banquet of the City Officials of Bruges in 1574 with portraits of various magistrates of the time, dated 1574. His Judgement of Cambyses (Groeningemuseum, Bruges) was probably also painted for the Bruges city hall. Although it depicts the story of the Judgement of Cambyses, it is likely a group portrait of identifiable figures, whose identities are not known. The story in the composition is lifted from Herodotus' Histories. Cambyses II of Persia was a king of Persia. Upon learning that a judge called Sisamnes had accepted a bribe to influence a verdict, he had him promptly arrested and sentenced to be flayed alive. He ordered the skin of the flayed Sisamnes to be cut into leather strips. Cambyses then appointed Otanes, the son of the condemned Sisamnes, as his father's successor. In order to remind the son of Sisamnes, what happens to corrupt judges and not forget the importance of judicial integrity, Cambyses ordered that the new judge's chair be draped in the leather strips made from the skin of the flayed Sisamnes. Claeissens painting shows the arrest of the corrupt judge as well as the passing of the bribe to the judge in the background. The story of Sisamnes was clearly still relevant in Claeissens' time and his painting would have served as a warning to the judges who heard court cases in the Bruges city hall.

His Family Saying Grace before a Meal (Shakespeare Birthplace Trust, Stratford-upon-Avon) is an early example of the Christian family portrait. It shows a family group seated around a table laid for a meal. They are praying. It is likely that the family is Catholic because the Imperial Habsburg escutcheon is woven into the damask tablecloth. The composition contains biblical symbolism, derived from Psalms 1 and 128. In the background to the left, the view through the open window shows a tree by a river (symbolizing of a good family man) and a vine growing against a wall (symbolizing the fertile housewife).
