= Otanes (son of Sisamnes) =

Achaemenid judge and later Satrap of Ionia during the reign of Darius the Great

- Otanes
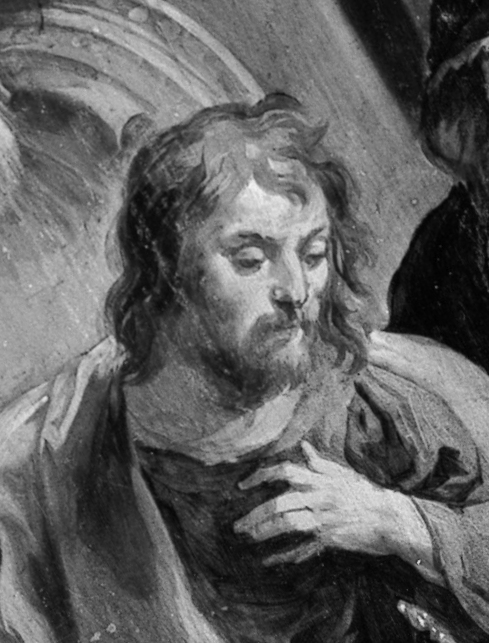
- Otanes son of Sisamnes, according to Peter Paul Rubens.
- Military career
- Allegiance: Achaemenid Empire
- Service years: c. 500 BC
- Rank: Judge, later Satrap of Lydia
- Conflicts: Ionian revolt

Otanes (Old Persian: Utāna, Ancient Greek: Ὀτάνης), son of Sisamnes, was an Achaemenid judge and later Satrap of Ionia during the reign of Darius the Great, c. 500 BC.

== Career ==
Otanes first replaced his father as judge, when the latter was condemned for corruption by Cambyses II. He later took on military responsibilities under Darius, that led him to have an important role in suppressing the Ionian Revolt. In Histories 5 (Histories 5.25-5.28), Herodotus speaks of an Otanes - a son of a previously mentioned Sisamnes (3.31) - who served as a judge under Cambyses II and later under Darius I, who followed the European Scythian campaign of Darius I, and became governor in Asia Minor:

First, however, (Darius) made Otanes governor of the people on the coast. Otanes' father Sisamnes had been one of the royal judges, and Cambyses had cut his throat and flayed off all his skin because he had been bribed to give an unjust judgment.

— Herodotus 5.25.

== Ionian revolt ==
Otanes was a major Achaemenid actor in the Ionian Revolt.

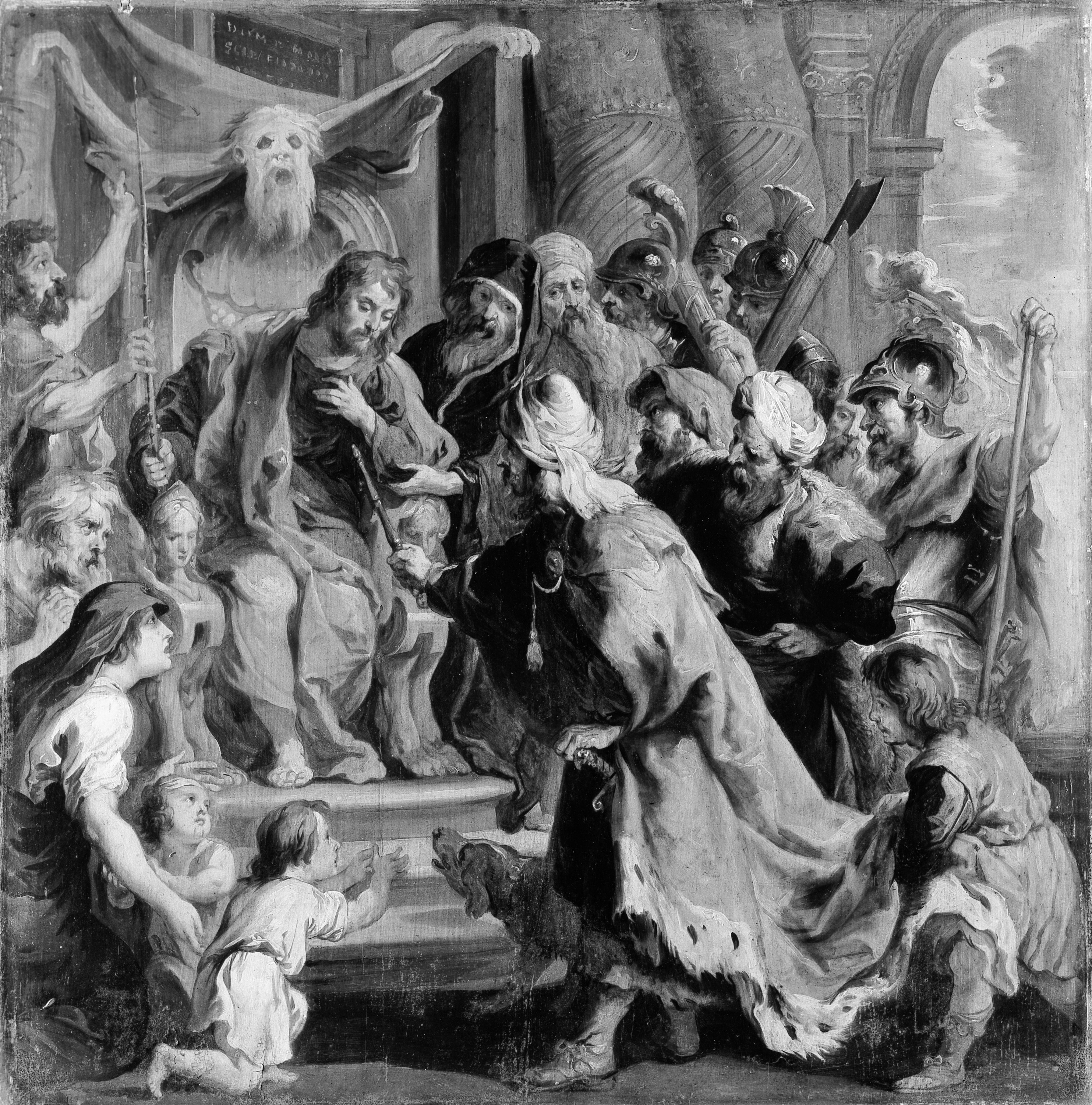
Cambyses II appointing Otanes as judge in place of his flayed father Sisamnes, after a painting by Peter Paul Rubens. The skin of his father appears above the seated Otanes.

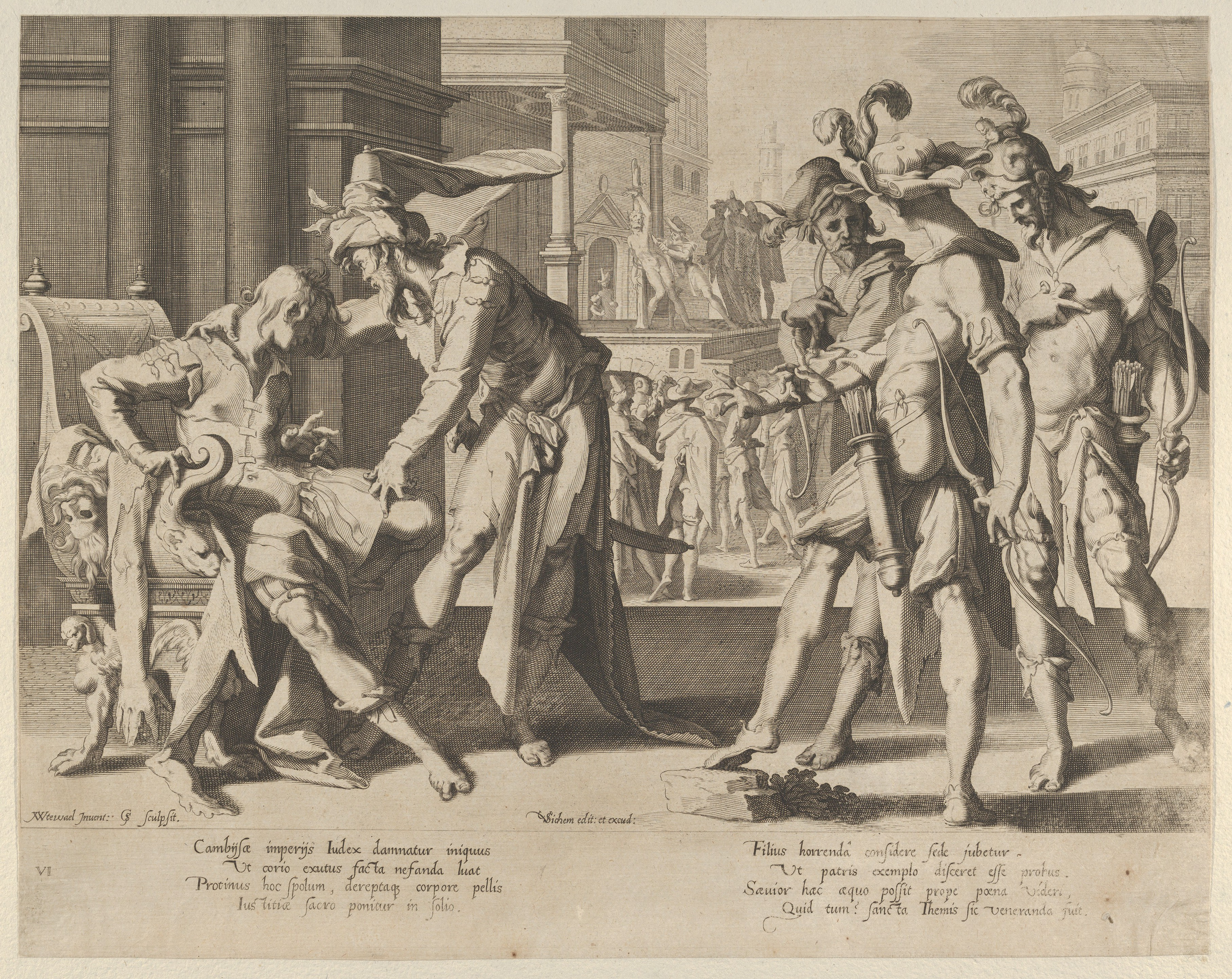
Otanes seated in the chair of the judge after his father was flayed (center).

Otanes succeeded Megabazus as the governor/supreme commander of the united forces of the peoples of the Aegean (5.26.1), and subjugated Byzantium and other cities during the Ionian revolt (5.123.1, 5.116.1).

According to Herodotus:

This Otanes, then, who sat upon that seat, was now made successor to Megabazus in his governorship. He captured Byzantium, Calchedon, Antandrus in the Troad, and Lamponium, and with ships he had taken from the Lesbians, he took Lemnos and Imbros, both of which were still inhabited by Pelasgians.

According to Herodotus, this Otanes also married one of Darius' daughters (5.116.1):

"Daurises, Hymaees, and Otanes, all of them Persian generals and married to daughters of Darius, pursued those Ionians who had marched to Sardis, and drove them to their ships. After this victory they divided the cities among themselves and sacked them."

— Herodotus 5.116

"Otanes" is a name given to several figures that appear in the Histories of Herodotus. One or more of these figures may be the same person.

== Sources ==
- Herodotus (1862). History of Herodotus, Volume 2. pp. 384–396.
