= Gillis Claeissens =

Flemish painter (1526–1605)

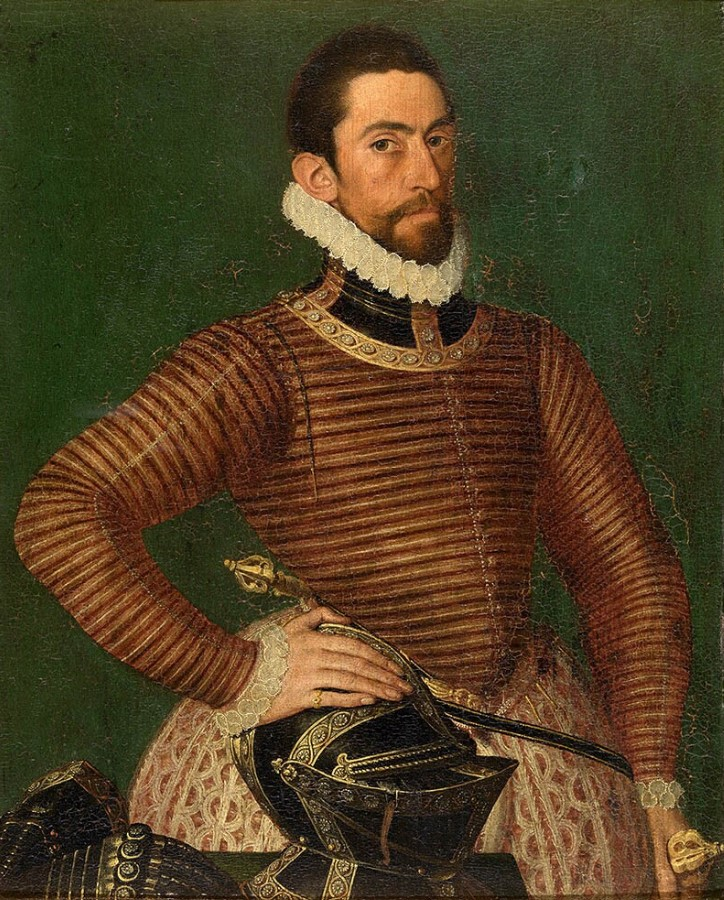
Presumed portrait of Gabriël Cambry

Gillis Claeissens or Egidius Claeissens (Bruges, 1526 – Bruges, 17 December 1605) was a Flemish painter of portraits and altarpieces and a member of a prominent family of artists originating in Bruges. It has only been possible to distinguish Gillis Claeissens' work from that of his father and siblings after scholars discovered a contract with the artist for the painting of a triptych. It was further discovered in 2015 that he artist can be identified with the Monogrammist G.E.C. These discoveries have allowed to recognise Gillis Claeissens as an important portraitist alongside Pieter Pourbus in 16th century Bruges.

== Life ==
Gillis Claeissens was born in Bruges as the second son of Pieter Claeissens the Elder and Marie Meese. His father was a history painter and portraitist and his grandfather Alard Claeissens was also a painter. Gillis had three younger brothers of whom Antoon (1541/41–1613) and Pieter (c. 1535–1623) both became painters while a third brother Ambrosius was a master goldsmith.

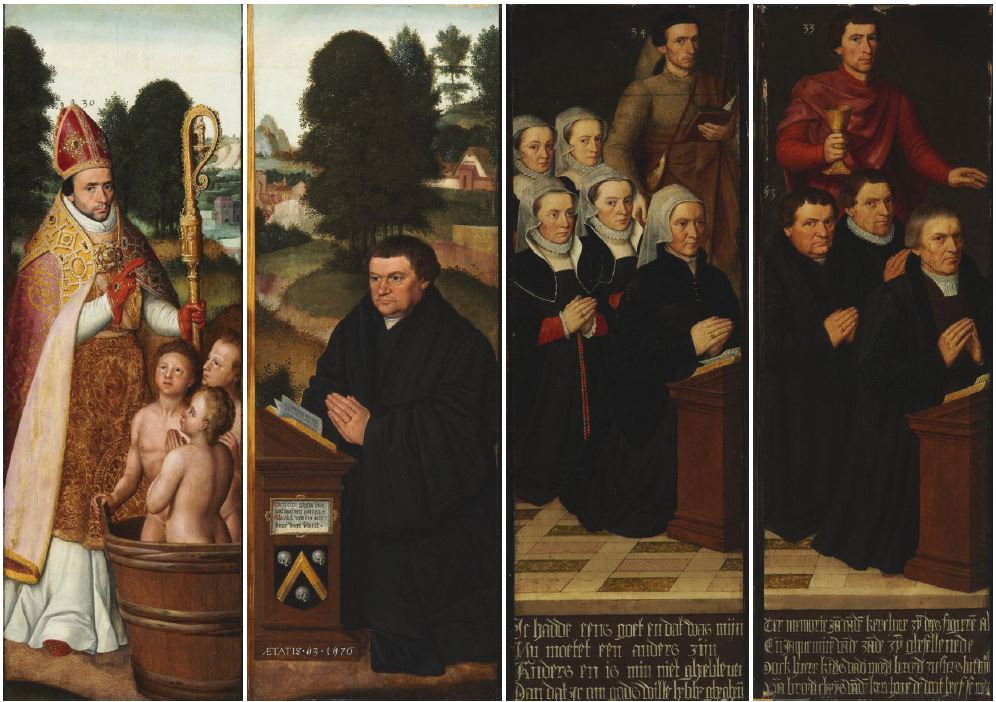
Triptych for de Kerchove family

Gillis Claeissens was admitted as a master of the Guild of St Luke of Bruges on 18 October 1566. He remained in his father's workshop until 1570, while his brother Antoon joined that of Pieter Pourbus. Both Gillis and Antoon enjoyed the financial support of their father before they became artists recognized in their own right. Gillis Claeissens was an advisor to the Guild of St Luke of Bruges in the guild years 1570–1571, 1572–1573 and 1584–1585. He was the head of the Guild in the periods 1577–1578, 1581–1583 and 1604–1605.

Claeissens married Elisabeth Boelandts sometime between 1576 and 1586. At the time of death of his wife in 1609 the couple was childless. The artist did have an illegitimate son called Gillis Claeissens the Younger who enrolled in the Guild of St. Luke of Brussels on 20 February 1601.

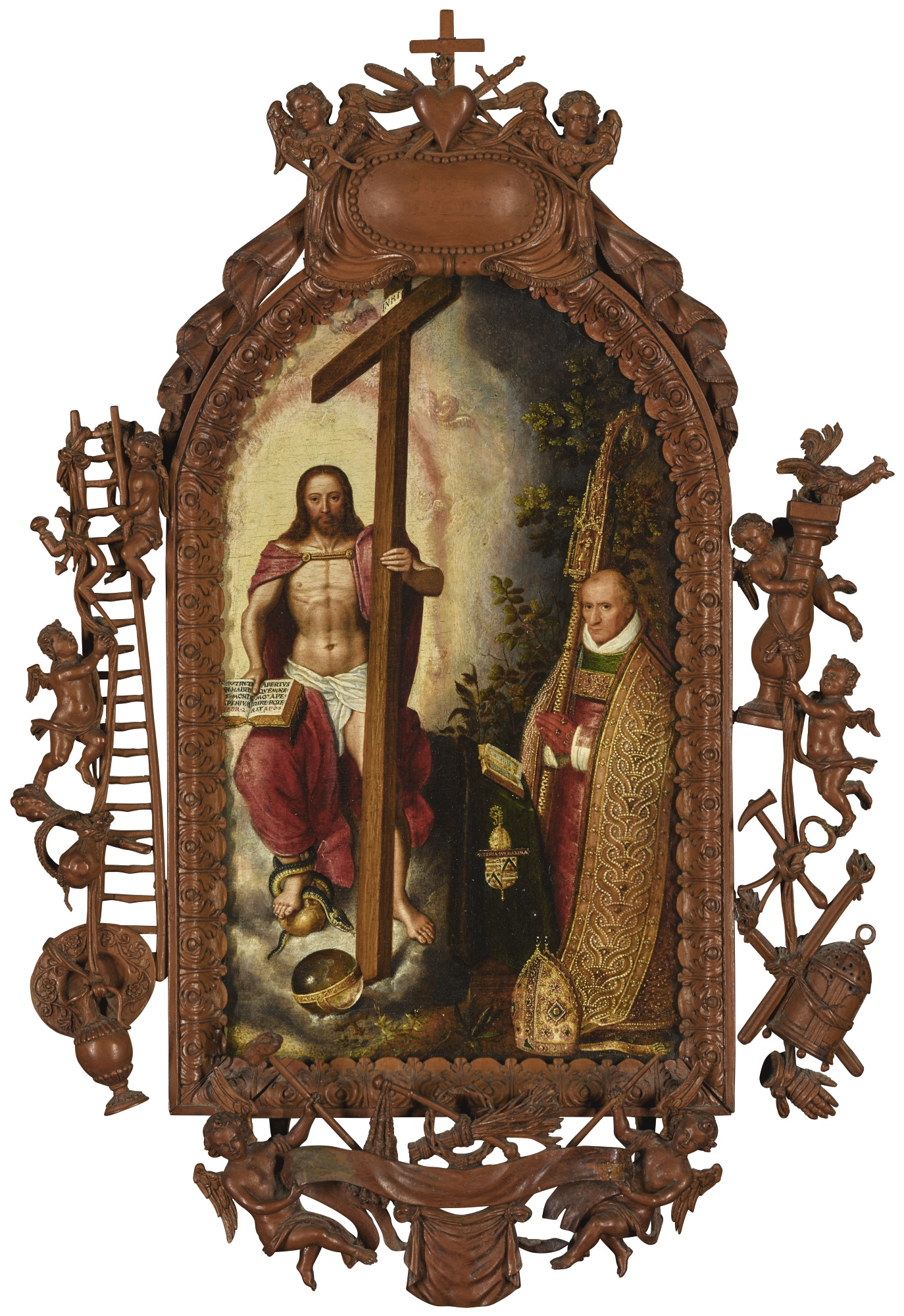
Christ the Saviour adored by Abbot Robert Holman

By 1589 Gillis Claeissens had moved to Brussels where he was nominated painter in title to the governor general of the Low Countries Alexander Farnese, Duke of Parma. After Farnese died on 2 December 1592, Gillis returned to Bruges. Four years later he returned to Brussels to enter the service of the Archdukes Albert and Isabella. For the Brussels court he painted religious paintings as well as miniature portraits of the Archduchess. In 1596 Gillis resettled again in Bruges.

Shortly before his death on 17 December 1605, Gillis Claeissens received a commission from the Bruges cathedral for the restoration of the high altarpiece of the church of Watervliet, near Bruges.

== Work ==
Until recently the corpus of Gillis Claeissens' work included no unsigned paintings and therefore his role as an artist was overshadowed by the more voluminous output of his father and brother. Thanks to the discovery by art historian Brent Dewilde of a document published in Het Brugs Ommeland in 1983 a number of unsigned works can now be attributed to the artist. The document dated 13 February 1574 was a contract for the painting of a triptych painted for Claeys van de Kerchove and his family as an epitaph for the family tomb in the church of St Catherine in Assebroek. The panels of the triptych executed in 1576 are now in the Museum of Fine Arts in Budapest, where they are still attributed to Pieter Claeissens the Elder. The discovery has allowed to identify as the work of Gillis the portrait of Robert Holman (1571, Bruges seminary and the Christ the Saviour adored by Abbot Robert Holman (Sotheby's London sale of 4 July 2018, lot 6). It has also been possible to identify Gillis Claeissens with the Monogrammist GeC (for Gillis Egidius Claeissens) whose three portraits are now given to Gillis Claeissens (two paintings in the Hallwyl Museum, Stockholm and another recently at Weiss Gallery, London).

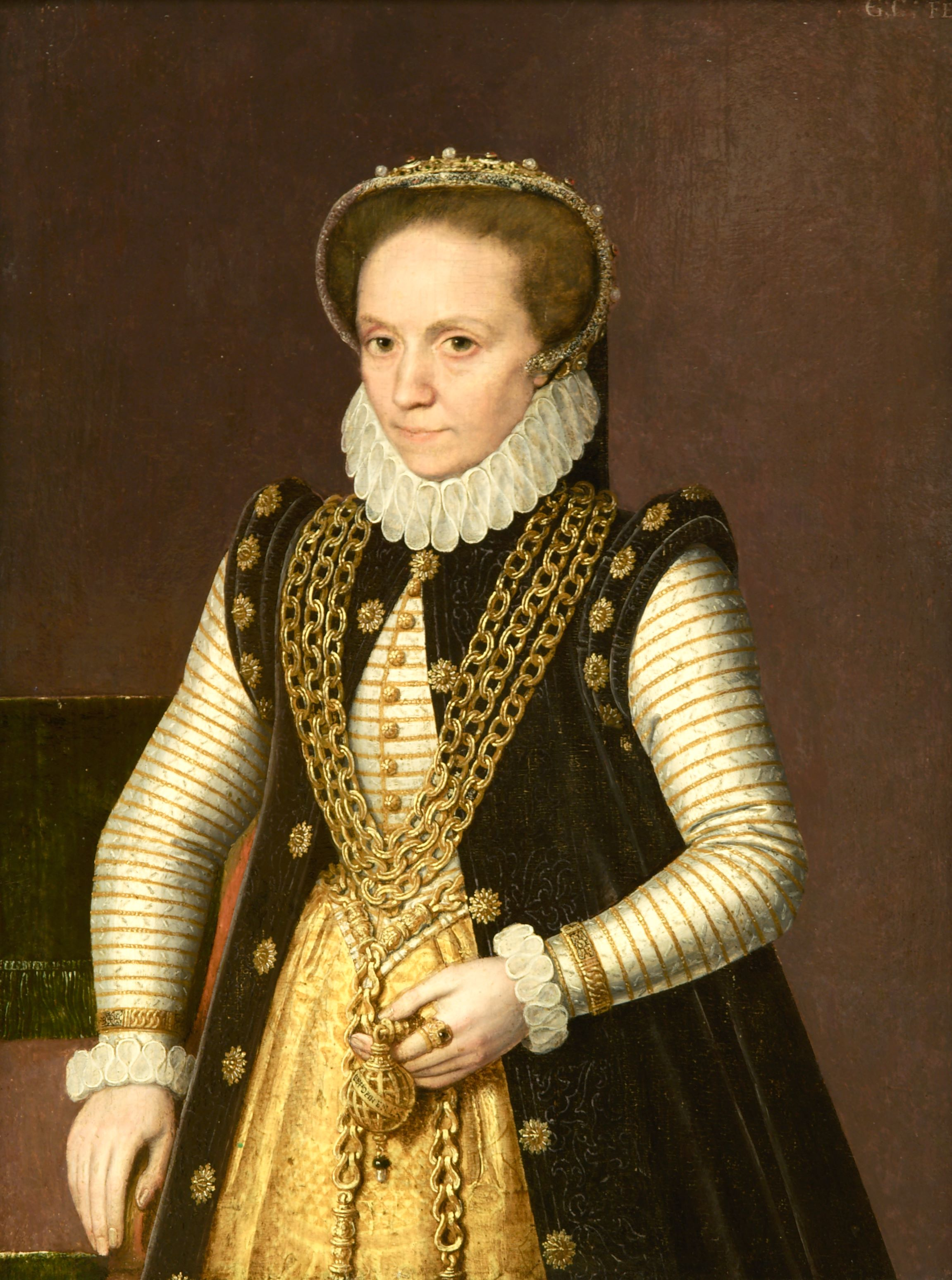
Portrait of a lady

Gillis Claeissens was a specialist portrait painter. He attracted for these works mainly commissions from noble patrons rather than the local bourgeoisie. He also painted religious compositions. A Crucifixion painted for the Archdukes Albert and Isabella is recorded.

His portraits are typically of fairly modest dimensions. They are distinguished by their refined courtly style, which may have been indebted to French models. Unlike Pieter Pourbus who adhered to humanist principles in his portraits by portraying his sitters in different, active attitudes, Gillis depicted his sitters in similar frozen poses and devoted himself much more to the suggestion of richness in fabric expression and jewellery. He showed a painstaking attention to the rendering of the material of costumes and jewellery. His sitters are usually represented in static and frozen poses, with slightly enlarged eyes. Their rosy and smooth skin is shot through with fine white lines which express the reflection of the light. These characteristics are also seen in the works of his brothers Antoon and Pieter the Younger.
