= Pieter Claeissens the Younger =

Flemish painter and cartographer

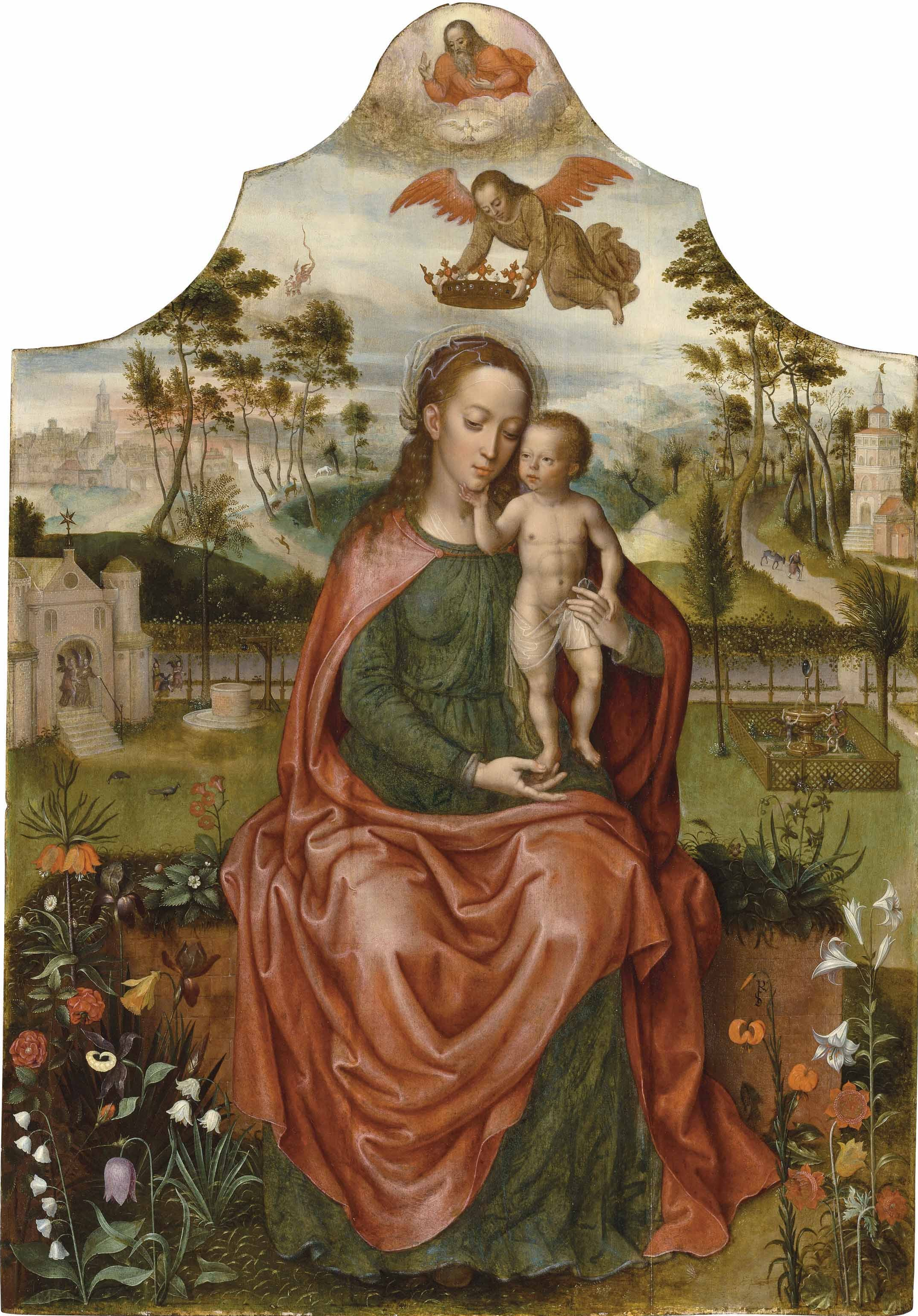
The Virgin and Child in a garden

Pieter Claeissens the Younger (also known as Claes, Claessen, Claeissins, Claeissz) (c. 1535 in Bruges – 1623 in Bruges) was a Flemish painter and cartographer.

== Life ==
He was the second son of Pieter Claes, the elder, who was also a painter. He became a master of the Guild of St. Luke in Bruges in 1570. He was dean of the Guild in 1587, 1600, and 1606. Pieter Claeissins the Younger succeeded his younger brother Antoon as official painter to Bruges in 1581. He held the post until 1621.

His brothers Gillis and Antoon were successful painters, while his brother Ambrosius became a master goldsmith.

== Work ==
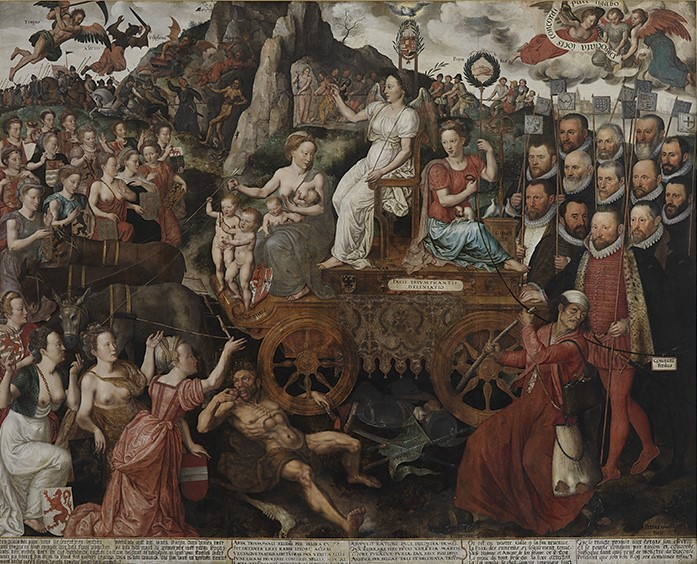
Allegory of the 1577 Peace in the Low Countries, Groeninge Museum. Bruges

Claeissens' work includes history paintings, allegories and portraits which continued the Bruges style into the second half of the 16th century. He is known to have collaborated with his father in painting the monumental Resurrection in the cathedral in Bruges, completed in 1585.

His Allegory of the Peace of the Netherlands in 1577 (Groeningemuseum, Bruges) was painted to mark the inauguration of John of Austria as Governor of the Netherlands. In 1584 he made a map of Ostend and a bird’s-eye View of Bruges to replace the original by Pieter Pourbus of 1566, which had become damaged due to its frequent use. The Church of Our Lady in Bruges holds an altarpiece by Pieter Claeissins the Younger on the Foundation of S Maria Maggiore in Rome.

His masterpiece is a triptych In the St. Walburga Church in Bruges, representing Our Lady of the Dry Tree painted in 1606-1608. There is also a triptych, an Ecce Homo, by him in the Bruges cathedral.
