= Pieter Claeissens the Elder =

Flemish painter (1500–1576)

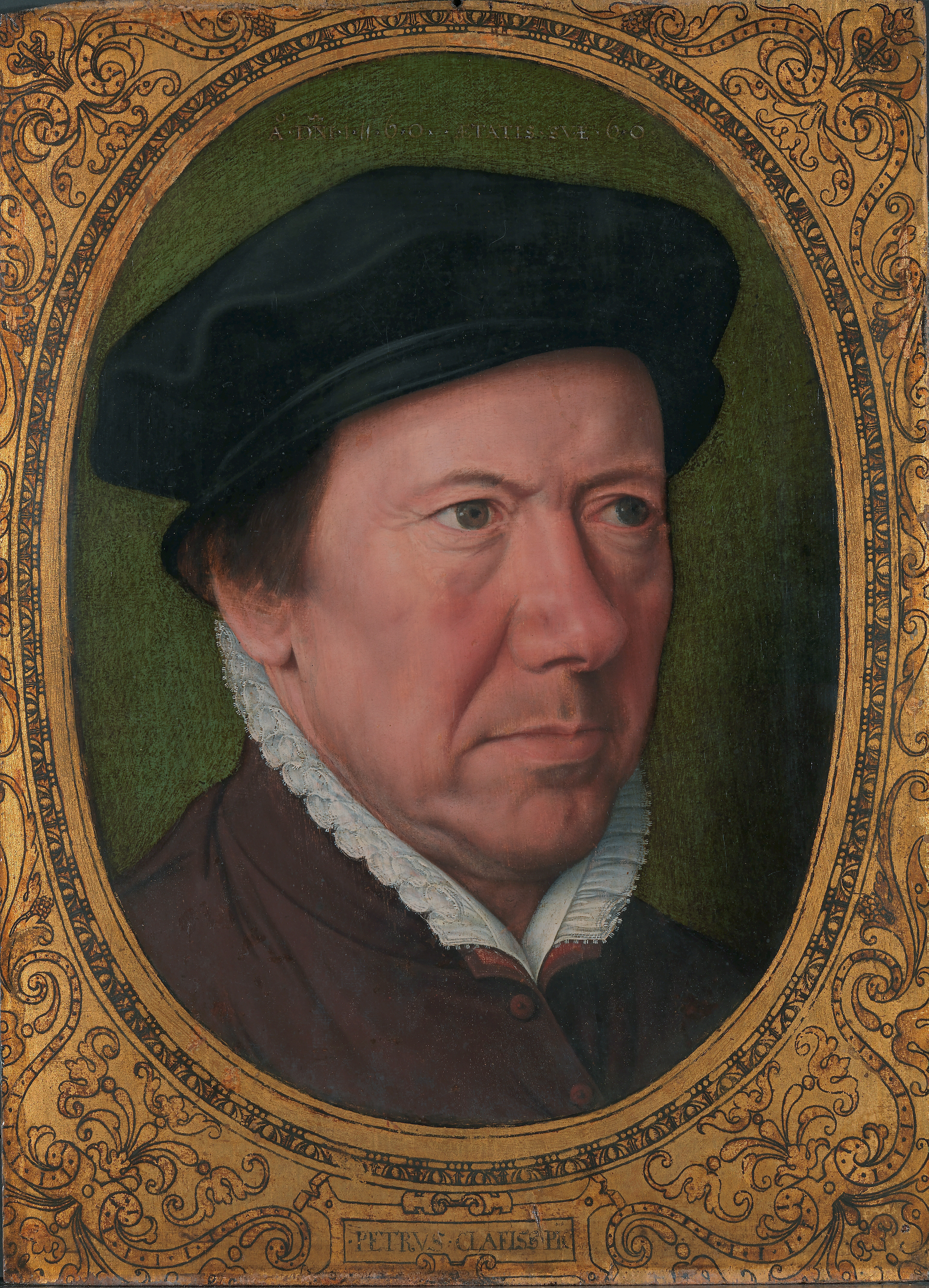
Self-portrait, 1560

Pieter Claeissens the Elder or Pieter Claeissens (I) (1500–1576) was a Flemish painter of history paintings, portraits and allegorical scenes. He was the first prominent artist in an extended family of artists from Bruges.

== Life ==
Pieter Claeissens the Elder was born in Bruges as the son of Alard Claeissens who was also a painter. He was registered as a pupil of Adriaan Bekaert at the Guild of St. Luke of Bruges in 1516. He was admitted as a master in 1530 and was dean of the Guild in 1572.

He married Marie Meese. Of their five sons, the four youngest would become artists: Gillis, Pieter and Antoon became painters while Ambrosius became a master goldsmith.

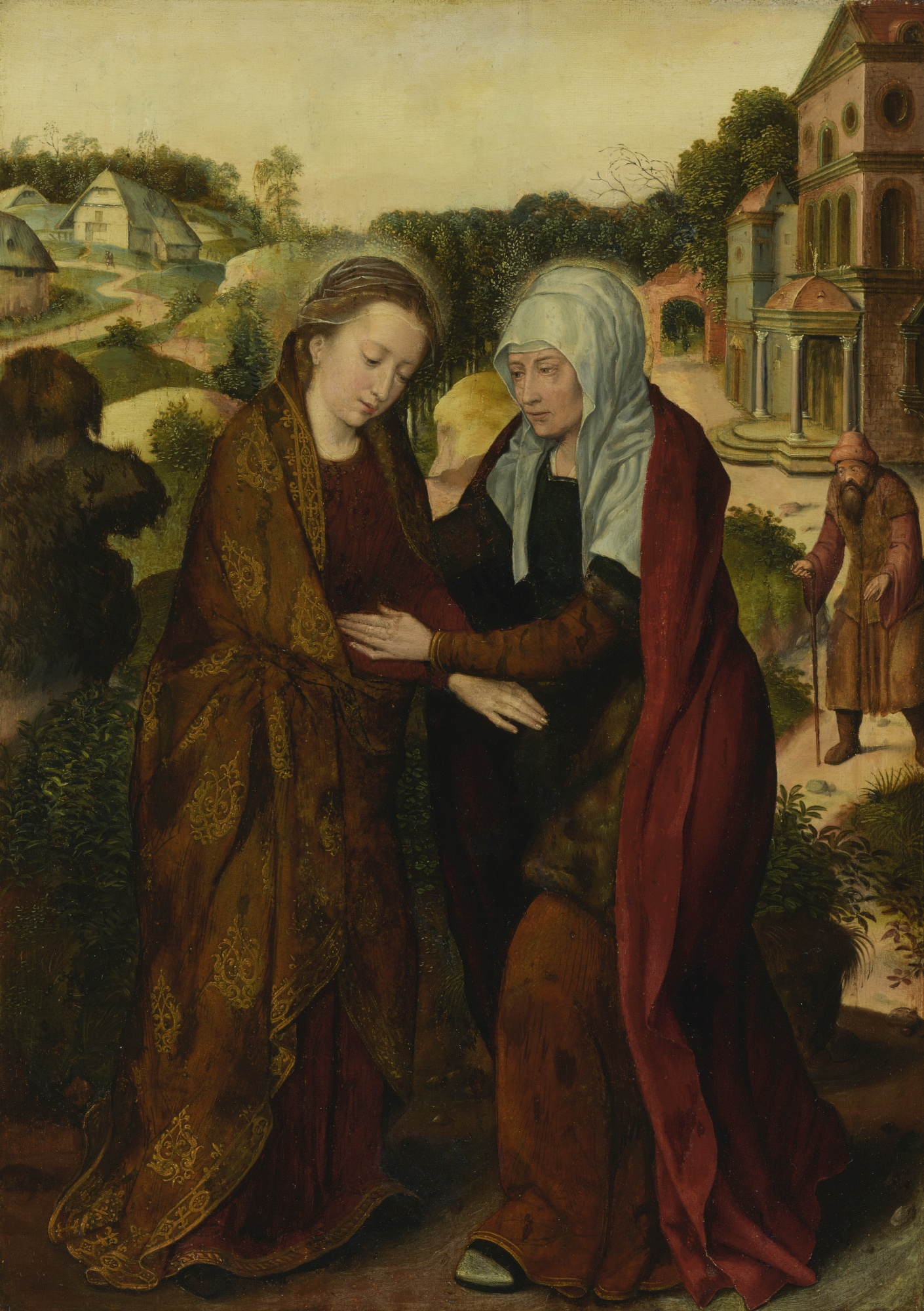
The visitation

Is it possible for Claeissens to cooperate with Benson in the period that he is fully aged from around 1520 to his mastery in 1530? In any case, it could explain the share of Pieter I Claeissens in the Spanish export market of works of art, where Benson is the leading artist.

Pieter Claeissens the Elder died in Bruges in 1576.

== Work ==
Pieter Claeissens the Elder painted history paintings, portraits and allegorical scenes. The attributions of work to the artist have traditionally been difficult because of the lack of signed works. Only in 2003 was it proven that works signed 'Petrus Nicolai Moraulus' were actually by the hand of Pieter Claeissens the Elder. Five works that carried this signature had earlier been regarded as being by another painter because of the conservative style in which they were executed. The generally accepted view was that Pieter Claeissens would have worked in a more progressive style. The study of four of the five signed panels (the fifth painting has not been seen since 1951) has enabled art historians to form a coherent image of the painting technique and composition style of the artist. Research with infrared reflectography of two of his paintings allowed the study of the underdrawing by the artist and support certain attributions to the artist. The complex situation of various family members working in the same workshop has created additional problems of attribution of works to individual family members.

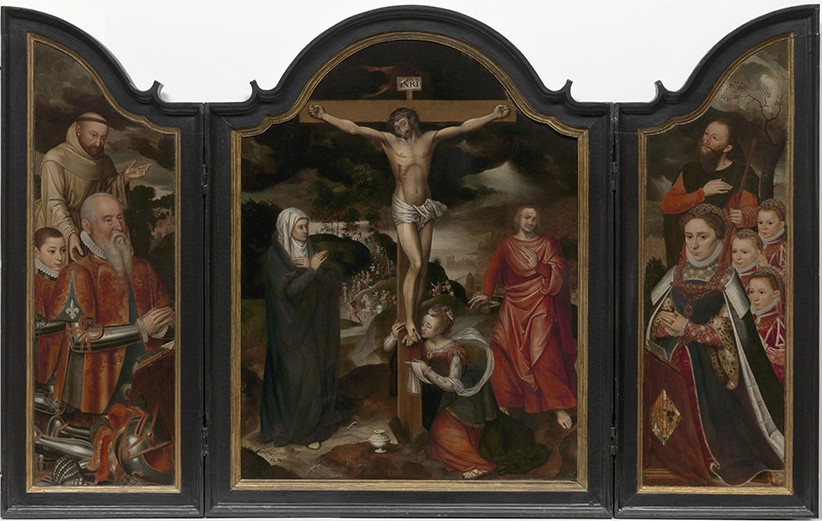
Christ on the cross with Mary, John and Mary Magdalene

Recently a number of works attributed to Pieter the Elders have been re-attributed to his son Gillis. This includes a triptych painted for Claeys van de Kerchove and his family as an epitaph for the family tomb in the church of St Catherine in Assebroek. The panels of the triptych executed in 1576 are now in the Museum of Fine Arts in Budapest, where they are still attributed to Pieter Claeissens the Elder.

Among recent attributions to Pieter Claeissens the Elder are a number of works that were formerly attributed to Ambrosius Benson such as, for example, the Holy Ursula (Museum of Fine Arts of Asturias). The kinship in a number of stylistic features between Claeissens and Benson and the resulting confusion between their oeuvres has given rise to the hypothesis that Pieter may have worked in the Benson workshop from 1520 to 1530 when he became a master in his own right.

The Claeissens workshop produced works in which the influence of the painters Adriaen Isenbrandt and Ambrosius Benson who were active in Bruges as well as the modernizing tendencies of the Pieter Pourbus are transformed into a personal style. The figures and compositions are designed according to stereotyped and repetitive patterns that were successful in Bruges.
