= Martin Hermann Faber =

German painter, architect, and cartographer

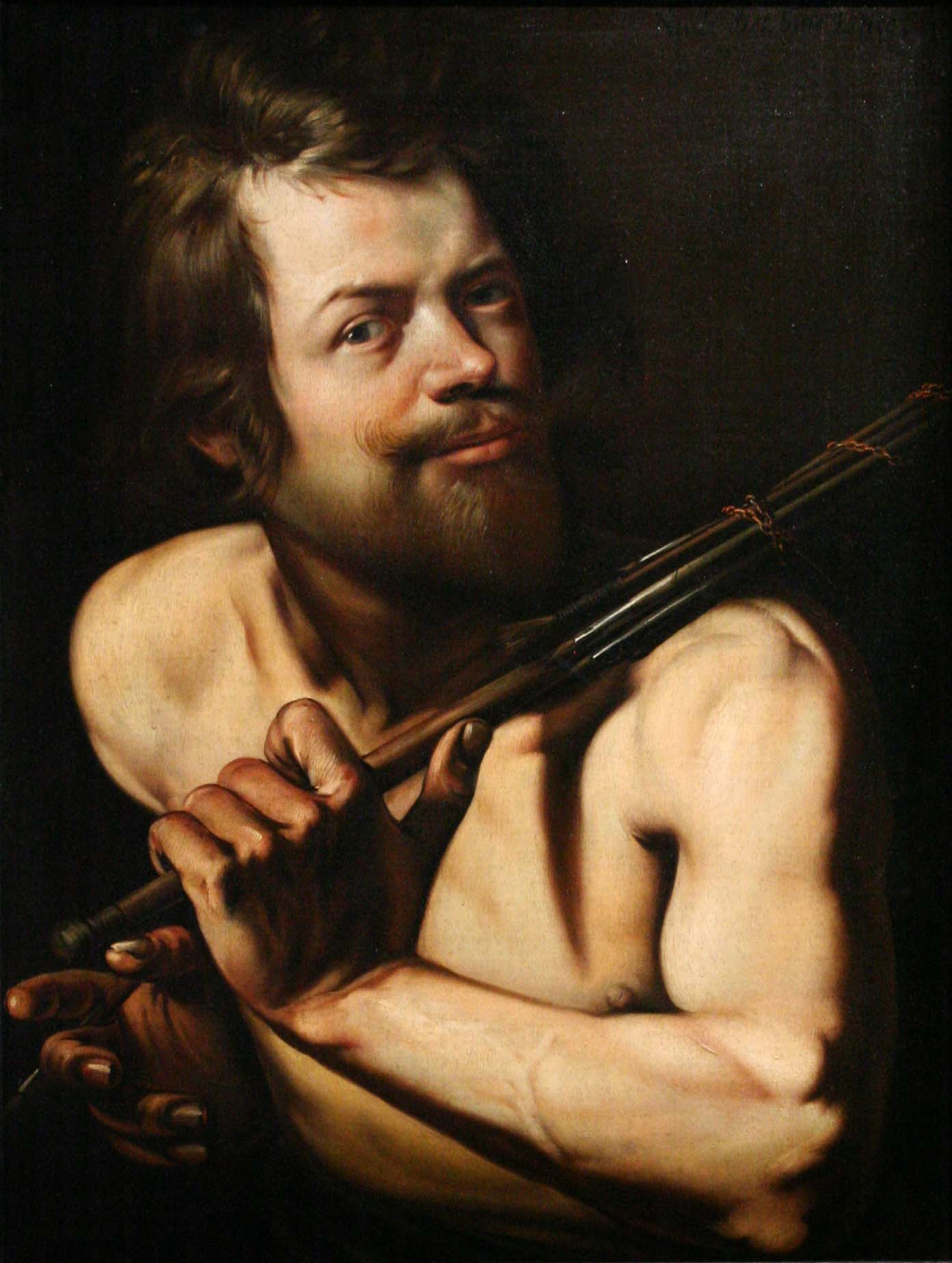
Self-portrait

Martin Hermann Faber (1586–1648) was a German painter, architect, and cartographer.

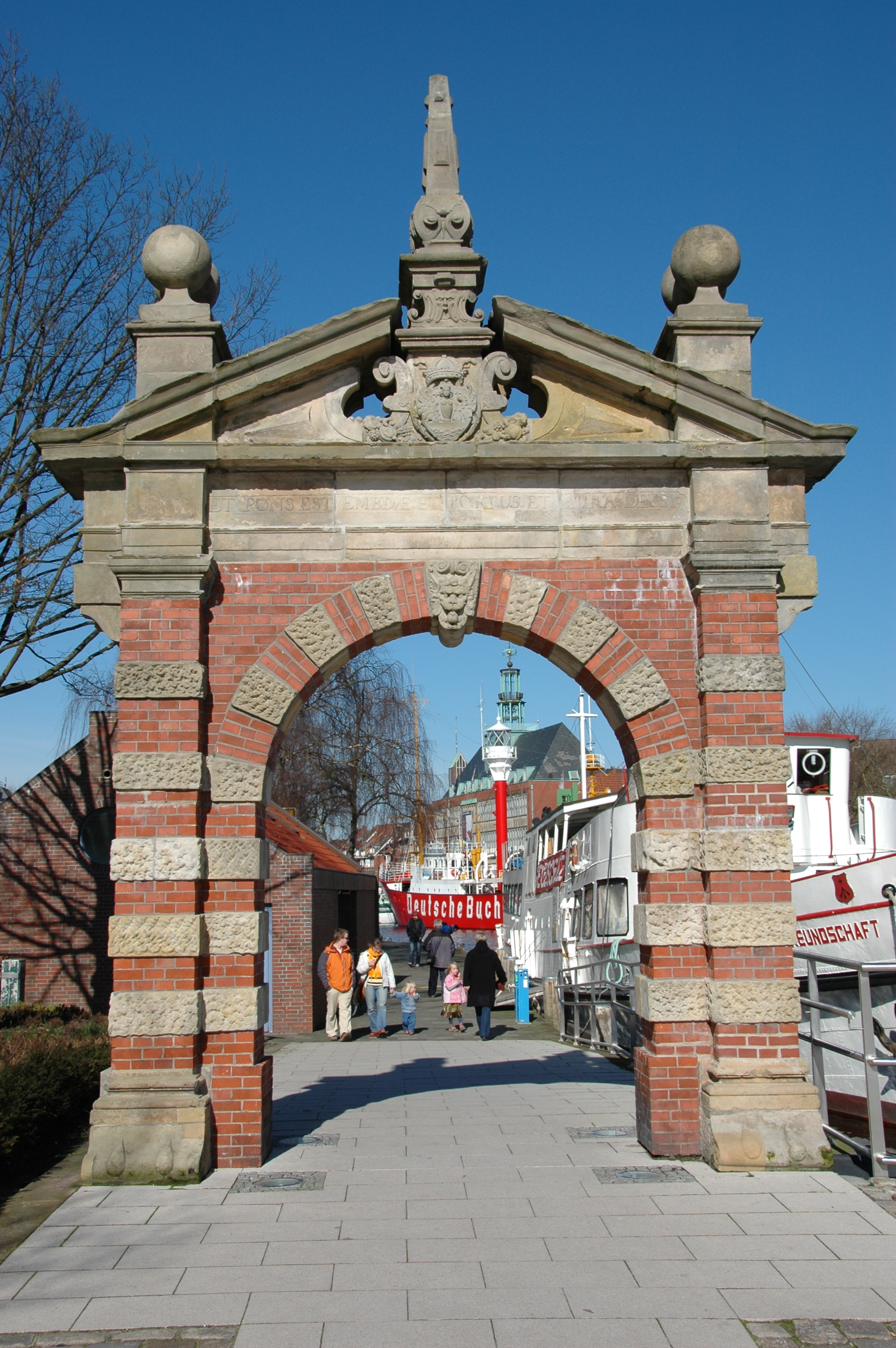
Gate by Faber in Emden

He was born in Emden and made a trip southwards to Italy in 1611 where he met the "Caravaggist" Louis Finson. He travelled extensively with Finson and worked with him in France, but was back in Emden in 1618 where he joined the Emden Guild of St. Luke. He remained a member until 1629, and his sons Berend and Hermann II also became members of the guild. He died in Emden.
