= Dirck Vellert =

Renaissance Artist

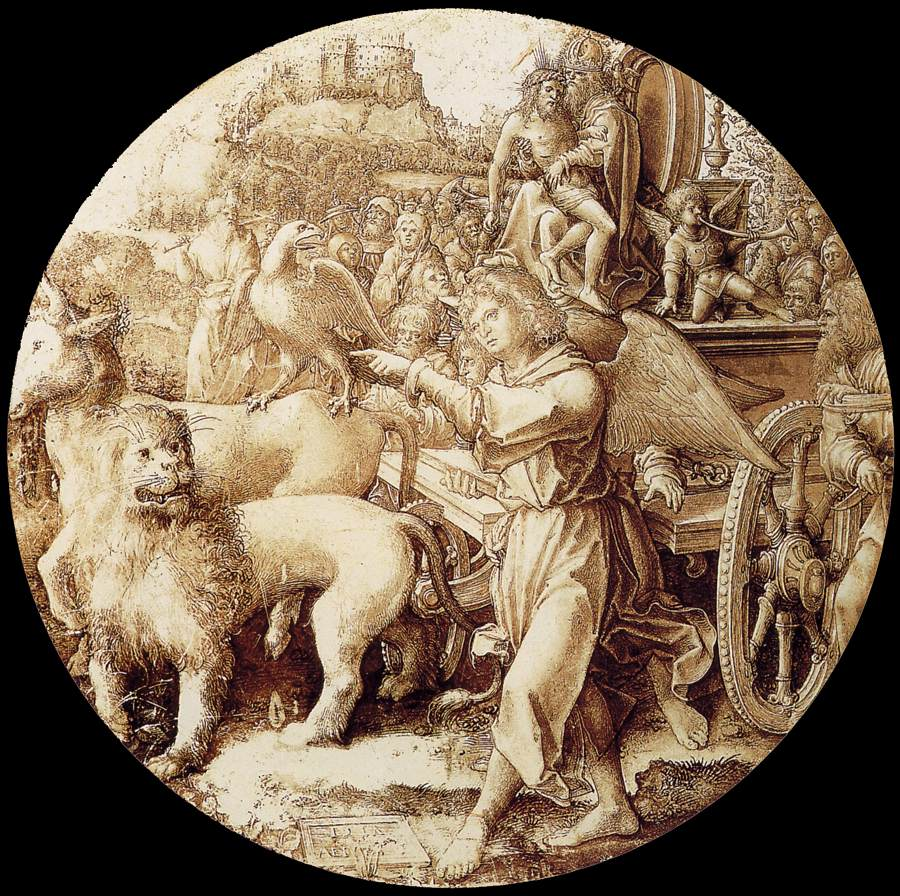
Triumph of Faith, stained glass allegory, 1517

Dirk Vellert (1480, Amsterdam – 1547, Antwerp), was a Flemish Renaissance artist.

== Biography ==
Painter, engraver, etcher and designer of stained glass windows and woodcuts. Known also by his monogram as master DV with the star. In 1511 he became master of the Guild of St. Luke in Antwerp, where he was dean in 1518 and 1526 and accepted pupils in 1512, 1514, 1528 and 1530. In 1521 he organised a feast for Albrecht Dürer who visited the city and impacted his production as an engraver. In 1547 he gave a procuration to two lawyers in Amsterdam. He was known for his famous glass workshop, and archival records show that in 1530 he took on six pupils. The workshop was a family business, with his wife Willems Jacomyne in charge of the commercial part of the business. He was one of the leading artists in the city of Antwerp, although today no paintings are securely attributed to him. As a glass painter he received international praise and it is possibly Vellert who was in charge of the monumental cycle of windows for King's college Chapel in Cambridge. Documented commissions include St. Mary's Church, Lubeck, Germany and the Council in Mechelen (both 1532).
