= Tâmpa (Brașov) =

Mountain range located in Brasov, Romania

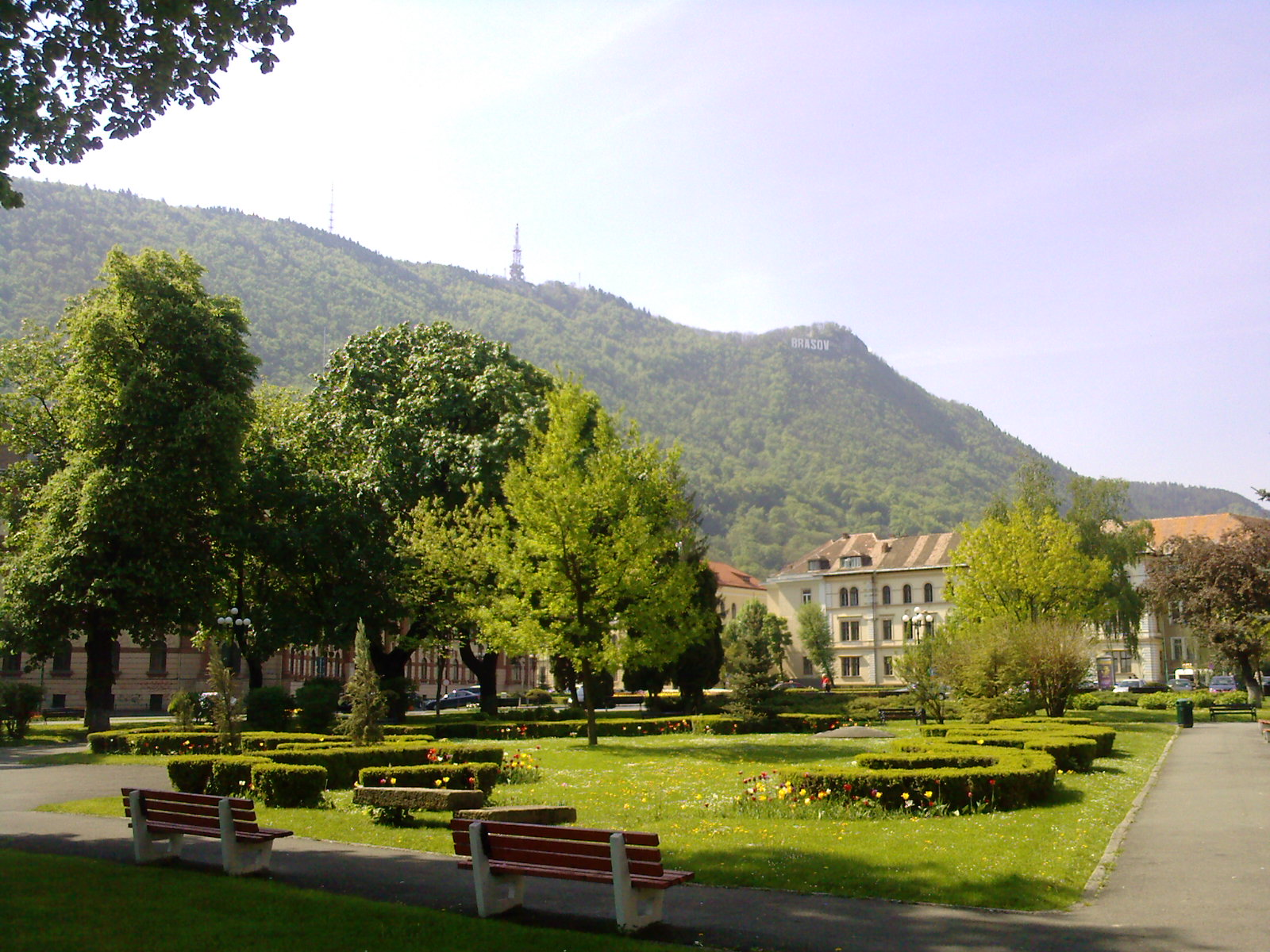

Highest point
- Elevation: 960 m (3,150 ft)
- Prominence: ~350 m
- Coordinates: 45°38′3″N 25°35′34″E

Geography
- Location: Brașov, Romania
- Parent range: Curvature Carpathians, Eastern Carpathians

Tâmpa (German: Zinne, or Kapellenberg; Hungarian: Cenk; Latin: Mons Cinum) is a mountain, part of the Postăvarul Massif, located in the southern part of the Eastern Carpathians (alternatively categorized as in the Curvature Carpathians) and almost entirely surrounded by the city of Brașov. Its elevation is 960 m (955 m according to some sources), almost 400 m above the city.

The mountain is mostly made up of limestone formations, having risen up gradually from the Earth's crust.

Most of the mountain (1.5 km^{2}) is a declared nature reserve, due to the rare animal species (bears, birds, butterflies — 35% of Romanian butterfly species) and plant species (a rare liverleaf species, Transylvanian windgrass) that are found there. A number of routes to the summit exist: a serpentine path with 25 hairpin curves, cut in 1837 by Brașov's forest administration; the Knights' road, dating to the days of the Brașovia citadel; an auto road; and Gabony's stairs. A cable car makes the journey between the cabin/restaurant Casa Pădurarului at the base of the mountain to the Restaurantul Panoramic, on its crest, in under three minutes. The view from the summit is spectacular, offering a panoramic view of the city; on a clear day, the entire Burzenland is visible.

== Tâmpa's flora and fauna ==
=== Plants ===
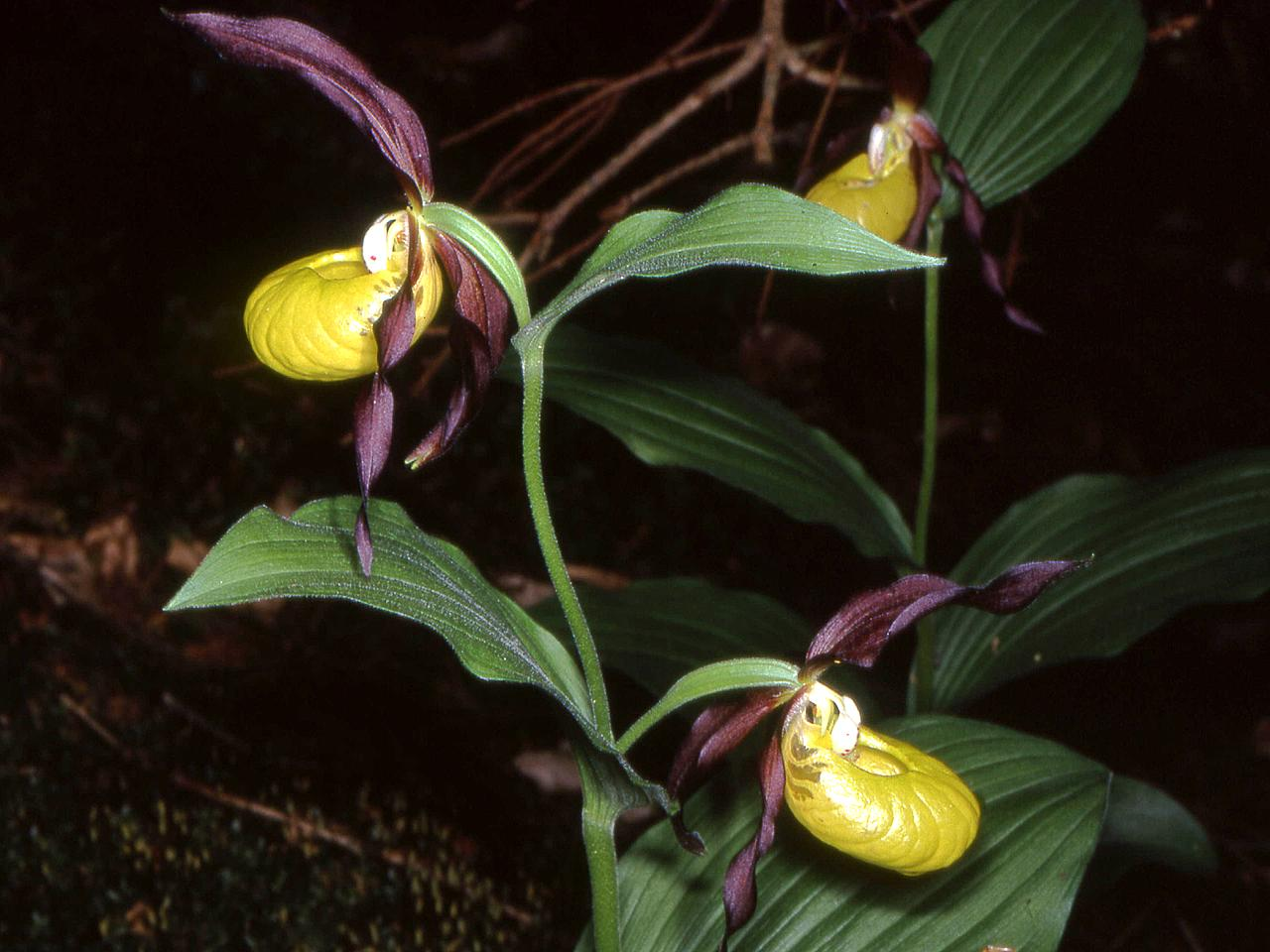
Lady's slipper

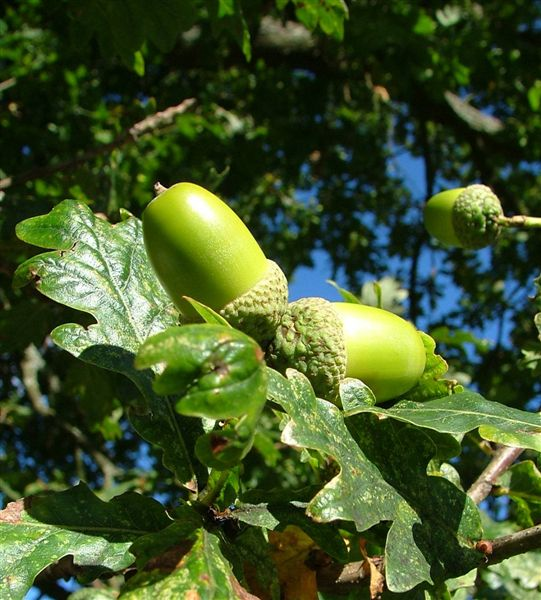
Acorns

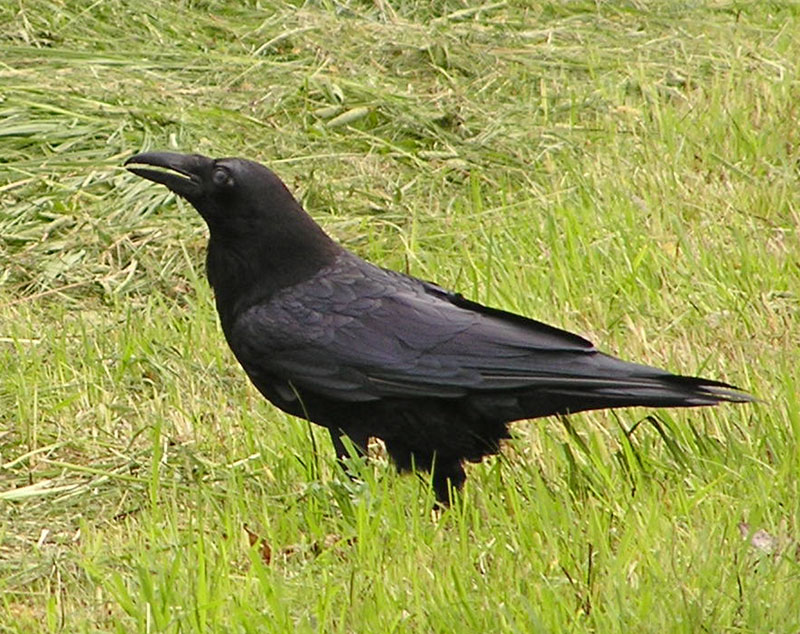
Common raven

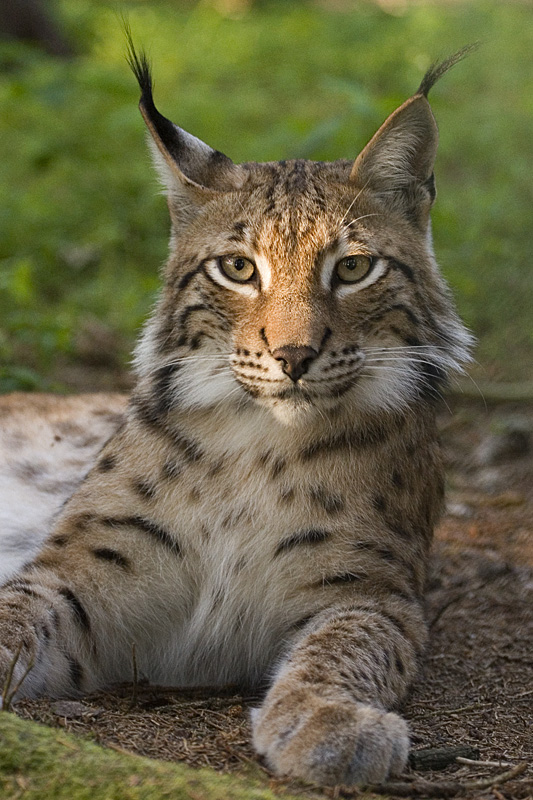
Lynx

Common name	Latin name
Braveheart's cross	Hepatica transsilvanica
Common dogwood	Cornus sanguinea
Common elder	Sambucus nigra
Common hazel	Corylus avellana
Cowslip	Primula officinalis
Dwarf almond	Prunus tenella
European ash	Fraxinus excelsior
European beech	Fagus sylvatica
European cornel	Cornus mas
European hornbeam	Carpinus betulus
European larch	Larix decidua
Feather grass	Stipa pennata
Forking larkspur	Consolida regalis
Ground cherry	Prunus fruticosa
Iris	Iris germanica
Lady's slipper	Cypripedium calceolus
Large-leaved linden	Tilia platyphyllos
Limestone's crown	Spiraea crenata
Mountain elm	Ulmus montana
Norway spruce	Picea abies
Pedunculate oak	Quercus robur
Rabbit's tail	Sesleria rigida
Scots pine	Pinus sylvestris
Silver plantain	Plantago argentea
Spotted tulip	Fritillaria meleagroides
Transylvanian windgrass	Bromus barcensis
Wild hyacinth	Hyacinthus orientalis
Wolfsbane	Aconitum
Wood anemone	Anemone nemorosa

=== Animals ===
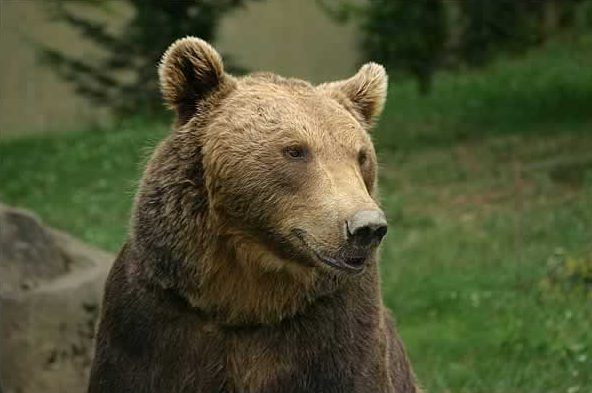
Brown bear

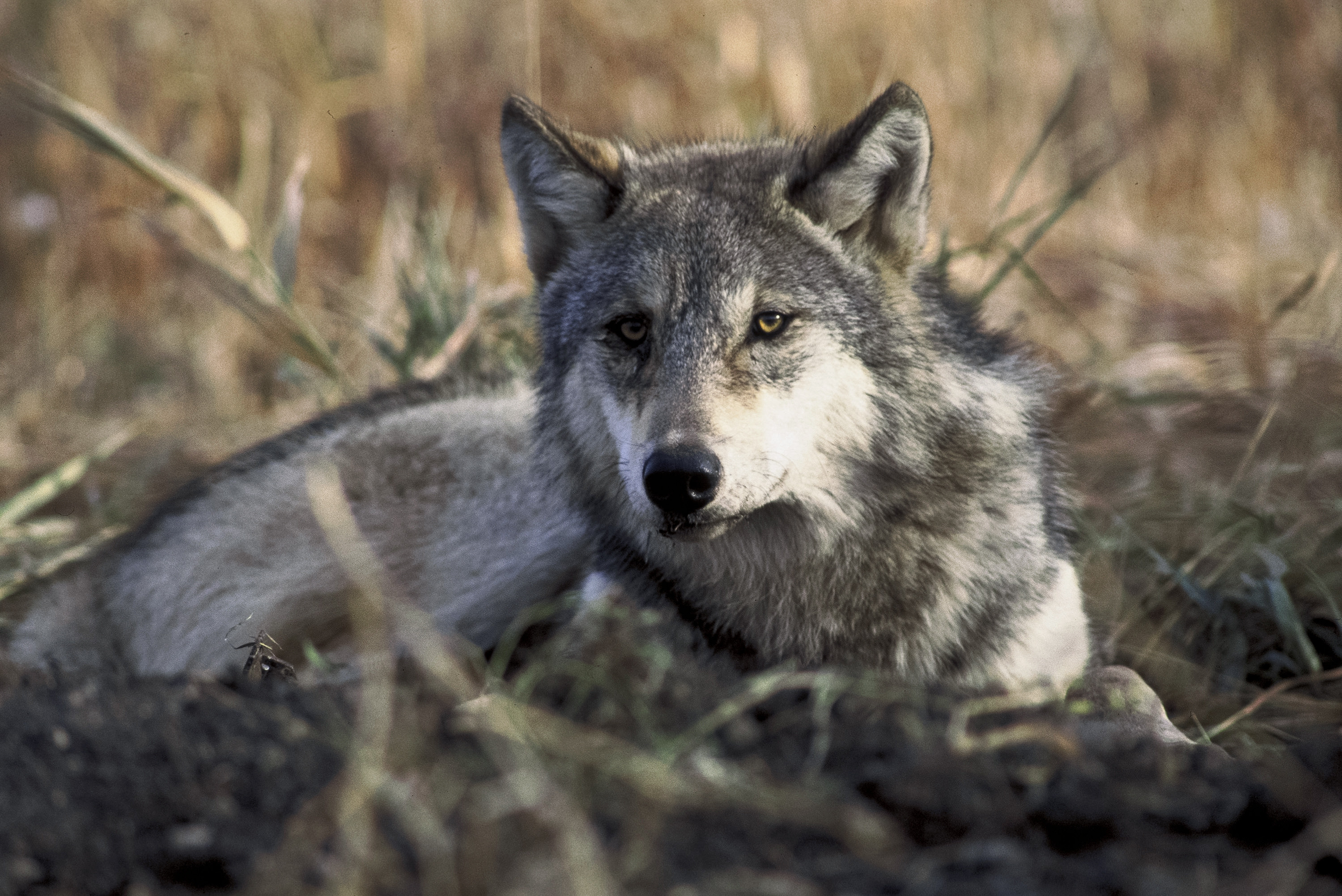
Gray wolf

Common name	Latin name
Brown bear	Ursus arctos
Butterflies	Papilionoidea
Common raven	Corvus corax
Eurasian lynx	Lynx lynx
European viper	Vipera berus
Golden eagle	Aquila chrysaetos
Gray wolf	Canis lupus
Red squirrel	Sciurus vulgaris
Other birds	Aves
17 rare wasp species	Apocrita

== Etymology ==
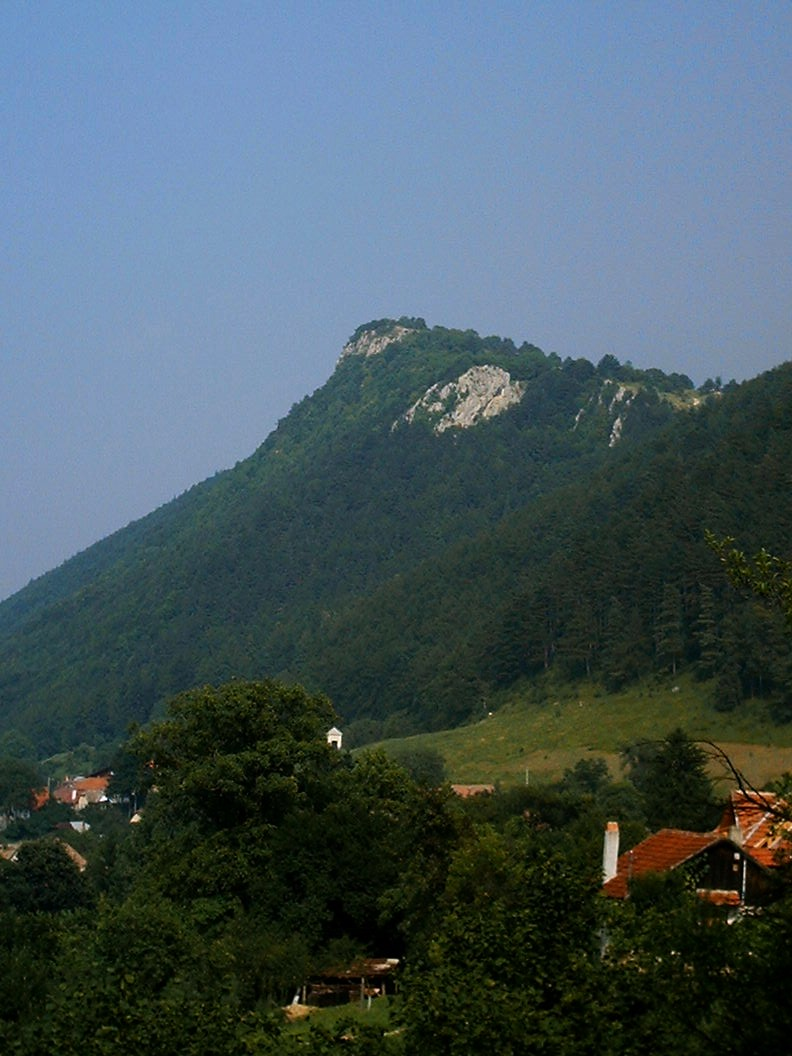
Big Tâmpa and Little Tâmpa

The etymology of the word Tâmpa, a name shared by several mountains, has been much discussed among Romanian linguists. Nicolae Drăganu started from the observation that Albanian and southern Italian dialects as well as Catalan have very similar words meaning "boulder", "hillock" or "rocky incline". He then proposed a pre-Roman, Thracian origin (*timpa), meaning "strait, mountain valley" and "mountain, rocky mountain". He was unclear as to whether the word entered Romanian directly or through Latin. Constantin Diculescu accepted the theory without important changes, pointing out that τὑμφα means "hillock" in Doric Greek.

However, Drăganu's theory was contested. Ovid Densusianu raised phonetic objections as to the link between Tâmpa and the Catalan timpes. Gustav Weigand declared that the toponym simply derived from the adjective tâmp, a word of Old Bulgarian origin signifying "worn down, leveled". Somewhat earlier, Alexandru Philippide had expressed the same opinion ("In reality Tâmpa is probably the adjective tâmp). Drăganu published a new article defending his thesis, bringing in new facts.

Iorgu Iordan was hesitant to embrace one hypothesis: he noted that the physical nature of the places called Tâmpa, which tend to be sharp mountains, favors Drăganu, as does the striking phonetic and semantic resemblance between the Romanian term and those in other languages. He notes, too, the existence of a noun, tâmpă, meaning "a very extensive mountainside, rocky and with a very abrupt descent"; also appearing as tâmp, it can mean "a hill or mountain abruptly rising to a great distance above flat land". However, he notes the difficulty of making assumptions about the obscure languages spoken prior to the Roman conquest of Dacia. He also points out that mountains are often named after particular characteristics, a fact that generally points to an origin in the adjective tâmp.

== History ==
=== Natural disasters ===
Through the years, Tâmpa has been relatively safe from natural disasters like mudslides or earthquakes. The most severe damage has been caused by fires, particularly those of 1689, 1731, 1860, 1880 and 1946.

=== Dacian cultic site ===
The oldest human traces on Tâmpa date to the time of the Dacians. On Tâmpa, archeologists have discovered a bone pit from that period, indicating that a pagan cult was practiced there.

=== Brassovia fortress (13th-15th c.) ===
20th century drawing of Brașovia Citadel

The Brassovia (Romanian: Brașovia) fortress was one of the seven fortified cities that provided the German name for Transylvania: Siebenbürgen, 'seven fortresses'. The building, located between the peak and the crest of Tâmpa, is presumed to have been raised in the time of the German Knights (1212–1218), or if not, was certainly fortified during their rule. In 1241, several Brașov families were able to find shelter there from Tatar raids. In 1397, before the war against the Turks began, Mircea I of Wallachia placed his family in the citadel. In 1421, the people of Brașov took refuge in the citadel, threatened as they were by Sultan Murad II. That year, the citadel was given as surety to the sultan, as the Turks dominated the city from on high. Thus, the fortification became dangerous for Brașov's inhabitants and for the entire area. After succeeding in taking it back with the help of John Hunyadi, the inhabitants decided to demolish it. Its stones were used to fortify the fortifications in the valley, at that time just being built.

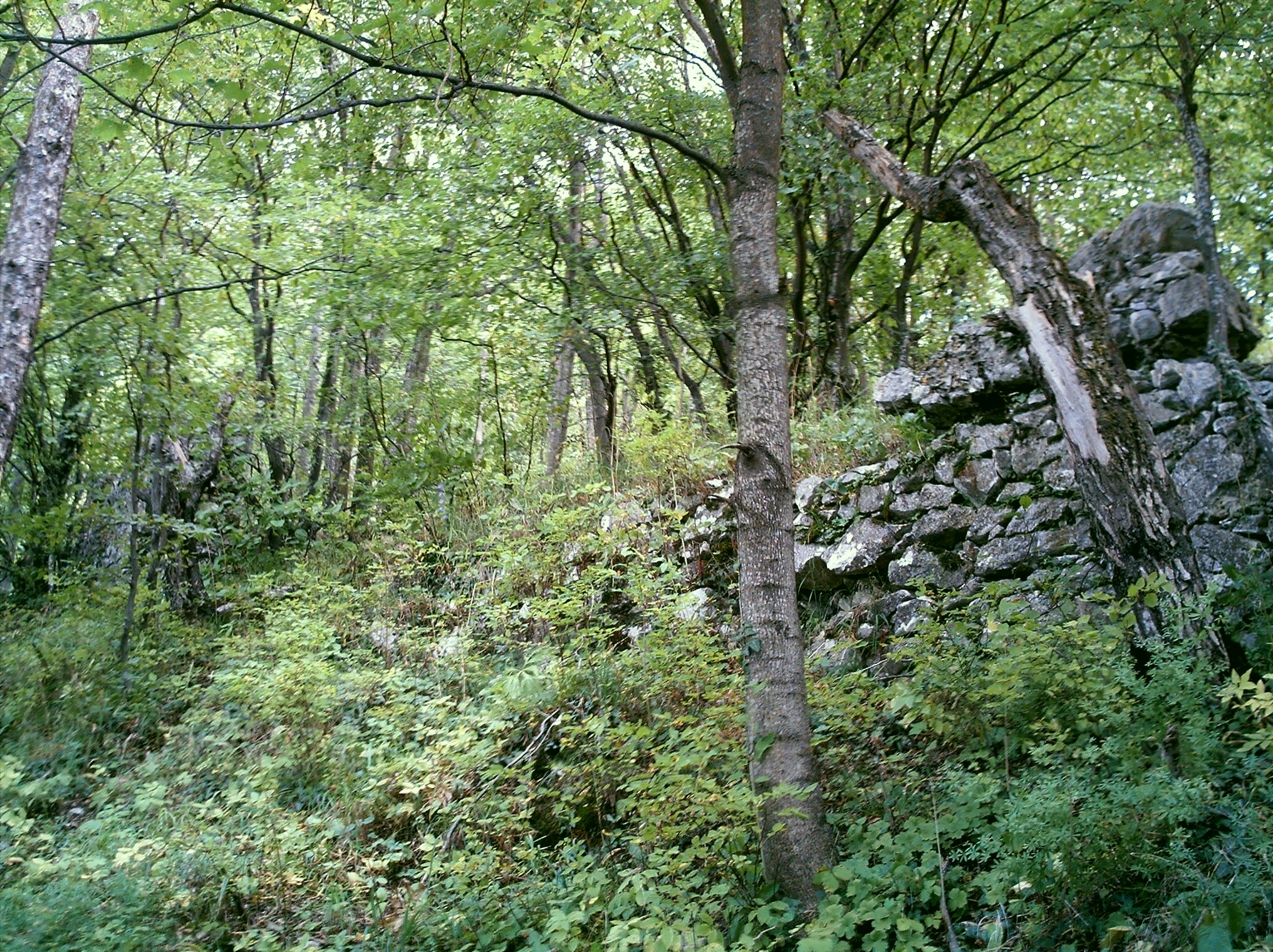
Ruins of the fortress

==== Description ====
The fortress was made of stone, with a small polygonal tower on the west side, on Tâmpa's peak. Along the walls were found small towers for defence. Within the southern walls, traces of small rooms have been discovered. There was also a deep well and a chapel inside. As the fortification was surrounded by precipices on three sides and was well-defended on its fourth, it was one of the most difficult to capture in Transylvania (indeed in all of Europe), and was in fact never occupied by force, only being handed over through treaties. Provisions were brought to it by people from a narrow valley called Cutun, to which it was linked by Drumul Cavalerilor (the Knights' Road). Around 1910, Costantin Lacea wrote that "even today the Romanian populace, especially the Costeni (inhabitants of Coastei and Costiței Streets), led by Junii Curcani ("the Young Turkeys"), go out the day after Pentecost up to the Citadel on Tâmpa, near the Cross of Cutun, and celebrate there. The old people tell how when they were young they used to play up in the Citadel on Tâmpa".

=== The two watchtowers (15th-18th c.) ===
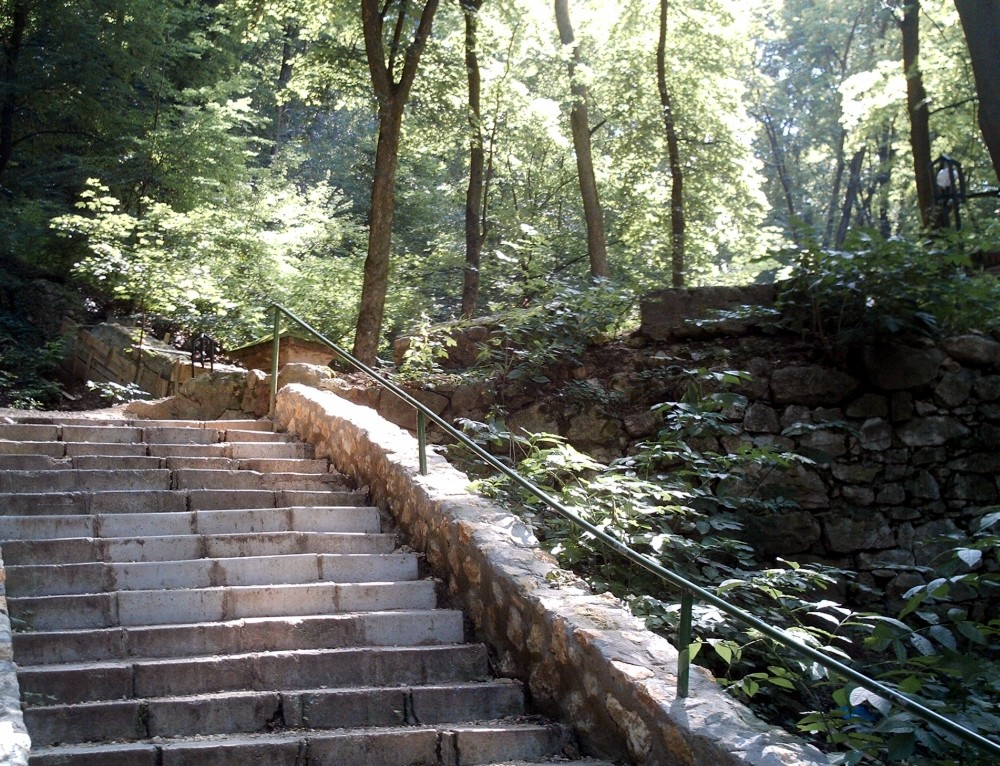
Ruins of Turnul Cizmarilor, with a portion of the wall

In the 15th century, two watchtowers were built at the base of Tâmpa, linked to the citadel through a series of walls, which, taken together, extended from the towers to the peak of the mountain. Probably left to decay after the introduction of firearms, the two towers were demolished in the 18th century (two engravings from that century show Tâmpa first with, then without them). Turnul Cuțitarilor (the Knife-Makers' Tower), located to the right of Bastionul Țesătorilor (the Weavers' Bastion), offered an open view toward the valley (Șchei). No trace of it exists today. Turnul Cizmarilor (the Boot-Makers' Tower), located above Bastionul Postăvarilor (the Drapers' Bastion), dominated Blumăna and Curmătura (the area between Tâmpa and Dealul Melcilor – "the Hill of Snails"). Today, the tower's platform, as well as a good part of the base of the linking wall built on the mountain, still remain.

=== Wooden summit cross (17th c.) ===
On the map prepared by Giovanni Morando Visconti in 1699, one can see a cross above Brașov, on the peak of Tâmpa. The Saxon author Thomas Tartler confirms this; he wrote, "there was a cross as big as a crucifix, as the Papists have called Tâmpa the Hill of the Cross (Kreutzberg)". The cross belonged to the Romanians from Șchei, who would raise crosses all through the valley, with or without the citadel authorities' approval, sometimes even at a very short distance from the city walls. One chronicle states that the Tâmpa cross was built on August 2, 1696, attributing it to the carpenters of Emperor Hussein.

=== Catholic chapel (c. 1700) ===
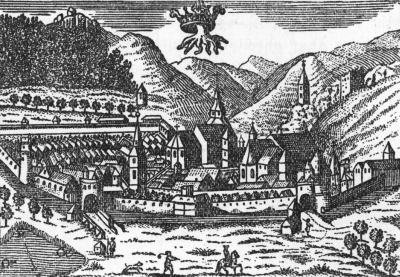
The chapel (top left) in a 1750 engraving

Around 1714 (according to other sources 1696 or 1718), the Brașov senator Johann Draudt, having converted to Catholicism, raised a chapel on Tâmpa, dedicated to Saint Leonard. After it was built, in stages, thieves or Lutherans robbed or desecrated the house of worship. On June 10, 1737, the day after Pentecost, at three in the afternoon, "lightning struck the chapel, in front of the altar, hitting a Papist German tailor and his wife, who had taken shelter there... Their dog was also struck". In time, only ruins were left of the chapel. For a long time afterward, Tâmpa was called Chapel Hill (Kapellenberg in German). Often, the Romanians of Șchei were blamed for the chapel's destruction: one writer said that they broke its door, hurled it into the valley, and stole several objects from within.

=== Russian monument (1849-1869) ===
In 1849, after the Imperial Russian intervention in support of the Austrian Monarchy (see Hungarian Revolution of 1848), Tâmpa became home to a pyramid-shaped monument, raised on the initiative of Lieutenant General von Hassfort and bearing the inscription Rusia et Austria unitæ MDXXXIL ("Russia and Austria united 1849"). Heavily damaged by either natural causes or, according to George Bariț, human intervention ("adverse hands"), the pyramid was ultimately removed by Austro-Hungarian authorities on April 7, 1869.

=== Schützenhaus (1865-1916); forestry school ===
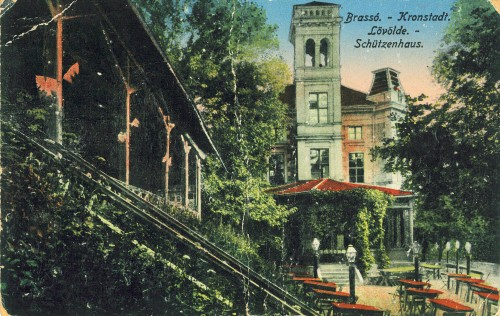
Schützenhaus - beginning of the 20th century

After 1865, Tâmpa housed the Schützenhaus (the "Shooting range"), soon a favorite with the city's male population. Aside from fire practice, the location had a bowling lane and a restaurant; it was decorated with numerous hunting trophies and mannequins dressed in plate armor. The building was badly damaged by a 1916 fire, and for a long time remained derelict. Ultimately, the Dr. Nicolae Rucăreanu High School of Silviculture was raised on the location — the plot remains disputed between the Evangelical Church and the city of Brașov.

=== Árpád monument (1896-1916) ===
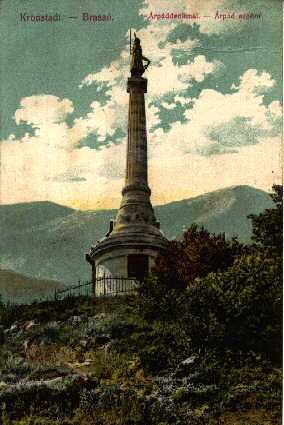
Árpád's statue, 19th century

In 1896, upon celebrating the 1000th anniversary of Magyar tribes settling in Pannonia under the leadership of Árpád (see Pannonian basin before Hungary), seven commemorative statues were raised throughout the Kingdom of Hungary. On this occasion, a monumental column topped by the statue of a Magyar archer — popularly identified with Árpád himself — was erected on Tâmpa, causing controversy inside the Romanian community. Stone used for the monument had been transported up the slope by a funicular, and the completed monument featured a lightning rod; overall, it cost 22,585 florins to build.

In September 1913, the monument was damaged by a bomb placed at its base, an attack carried out by two terrorists, Ilie Cătărău and Timofei Kirilov, who were fighting against Hungarian rule in Transylvania. In December of the same year, the monument was heavily damaged by a thunderstorm: the "Árpád statue" fell from atop the column and shattered into pieces. In 1916, the remaining parts were detonated by the Romanian Army during its World War I advance into Transylvania (see Romanian Campaign). The statue's debris was removed by Communist Romanian authorities in 1966, and the head is preserved by the Parish House of the Reformed Church in Brașov. Tâmpa still houses the base of the monument.

=== Béthlen Restaurant (1890-1977); marble cross and Brașov sign ===
Béthlen Restaurant, initial look

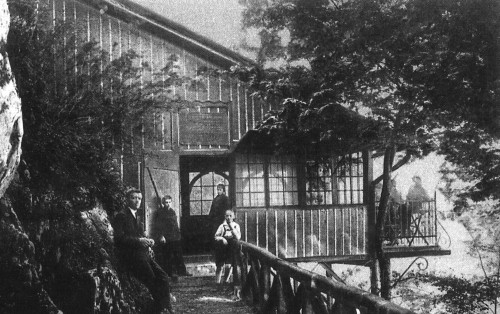
Béthlen Restaurant, after enlargement

Around 1890, the mountain became home to a restaurant and public house, owned by the patrons of the Schützenhaus and named Béthlen (or Béthlen Grotto) in 1891, in honour of a Hungarian minister who had visited the city during that year. Supplied every day by the tenant, who led his donkey up 25 serpentine windings, it became a regular spot for city residents who were attracted by the panoramic scenery of Brașov at nighttime; in 1905, it was equipped with a terrace reaching over the steep slope. The restaurant's name was changed to Cabana-restaurant "Tâmpa" ("The Tâmpa Cabin-Restaurant") in 1948. On March 23, 1977, the entire building burned down following an accident. The terrace and stone beer recipients are still in place.

In 2001, the Brașov County Council erected a marble cross on the perimeter. The lit sign bearing the name Brașov was restored in 2006.

=== Aqueduct ===
Brașov Aqueduct

Also in 1891–1892, the Brașov Aqueduct was erected on the Tâmpa ridge, under the direction of engineer Christian Kertsch (best remembered for his Kertsch House in downtown Brașov). Water was carried through ceramic pipes over a great distance, from springs on the other side of Tâmpa. Pipe deterioration eventually forced Brașov authorities to provide the aqueduct with water from the city area (popular myth still has it that water running through the aqueduct is spring water, and, occasionally, people still supply themselves directly from that location). Shards of ceramic pipes and a memorial plaque for engineer P. Bartusch are still visible on the way to Râpa Dracului (going around the mountain).

=== Casa Pădurarului ===
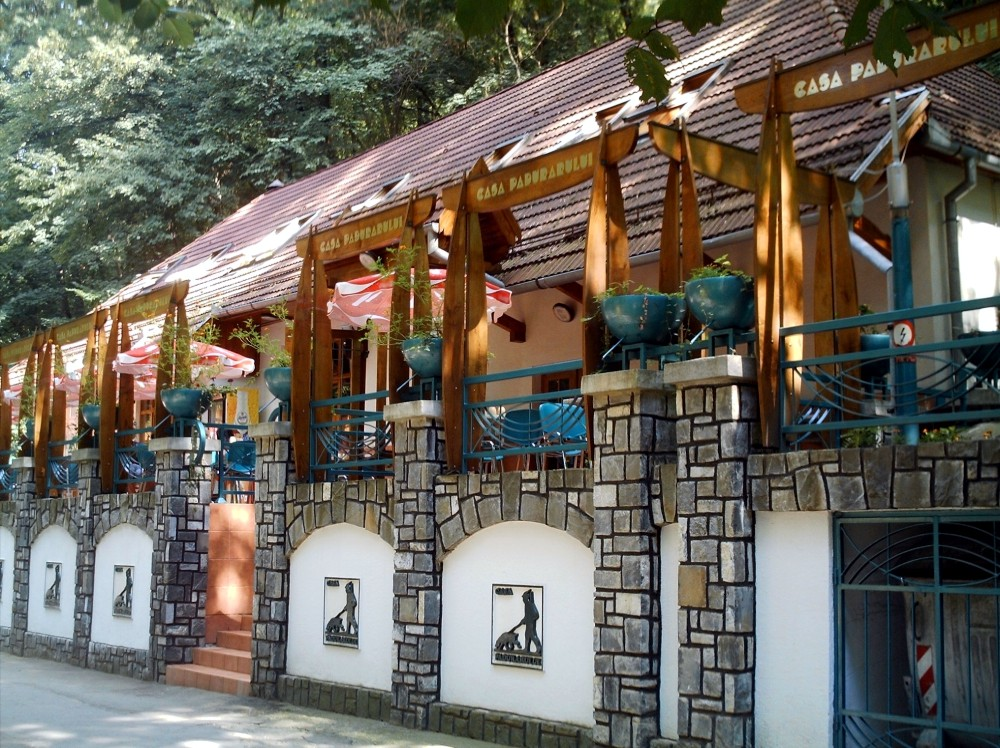
Casa Pădurarului

Casa Pădurarului ("the Forester House") is a rustic restaurant located at the base of Tâmpa, about halfway along the pedestrian road there. Built at the beginning of the 20th century, it served as a place of rest for the residents of Brașov who would walk along the promenade below Tâmpa. Near this restaurant, rebuilt in the 2000s after being damaged by a fire, the cable car starts its course, taking passengers in less than three minutes to the Panoramic restaurant, located atop the mountain.

=== Recent ===
In 1968–1969, a television tower as well as a restaurant and a cable car were built on Tâmpa's crest. Today, the tower receives a signal from Postăvaru and transmits it to the city below (initially with 10 kW, but today with just 2 kW), while the Panoramic restaurant, situated in a favourable location, offers excellent views of the city from its dining hall. The Aro-Palace society is the owner. The cable car terminus is also located beneath the tower. Before 1989, when tourists exited the cable car, they were met by an enormous stuffed brown bear, standing menacingly on two feet. At the same time as this complex was built, a short distance away, a flagpole was also erected. In 2004, the Brașov County Council provided it with festive lighting, installing a powerful laser floodlight that lights up the sky a good part of every evening.

== Stories ==
=== The tunnels and the lake ===
A story has it that there was a tunnel connecting Casa Sfatului with a cave under Șaua Tâmpei, in which German prisoners of war were held during World War I, with both ends of the tunnel blocked.

At the beginning on the 1940s, there was a proposal to dig a tunnel under Mount Tâmpa, to connect the Old City with Valea Cetății neighborhood. After Romania entered World War II, the project was abandoned. During the Communist period, when massive construction projects were undertaken in Răcădău, with over 10,000 apartments built, the plans for the tunnel were resurrected. One such plan, drafted in 1979, envisioned an east–west tunnel, with a length of 842 m, width of 9.8 m, and height of 7.65 m. The construction would have involved excavating 100,000 m³ of rock, at a cost (in 1984) of 163 million lei. Another estimate, done in 2003 by the Brașov County Council, put the cost of building the tunnel ar near 11 million euros.

A long-held belief is that there is a big lake inside the mountain. Drilling the tunnel may lead to flooding the city. Yet no concrete evidence of such a lake has ever been found.

What is known for sure is that there are three or four tunnels under Tâmpa, only one of which is usable at present. This tunnel connects Casa Sfatului with one of the towers of the old citadel (Turnul Cuțitarilor or Bastionul Postăvarilor). Due to the danger of cave-ins the tunnels pose, they are all shut with metal grates. It is said that during the bombing of Romania in World War II, one of the tunnels was blocked by debris, burying alive those people who had taken refuge in there.

=== The stone bench ===
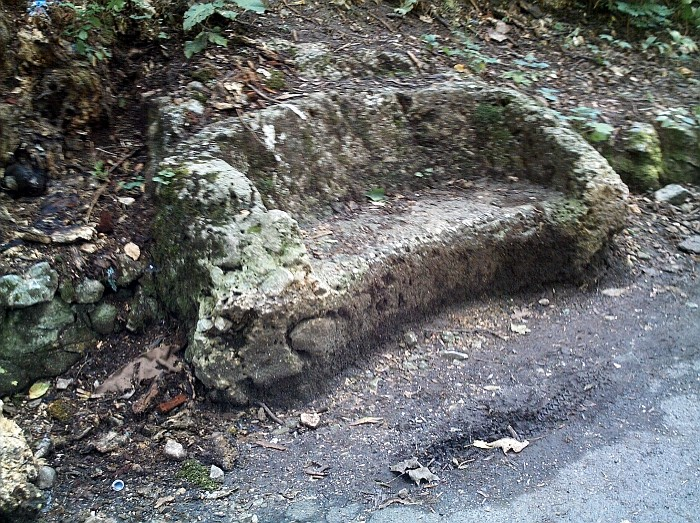
The stone bench from Tâmpa

At the foot of Tâmpa, along the southeast side of the old fortress walls, there is a tree-lined path—a favorite strolling spot for the inhabitants. Among the wooden benches lining the path, there lies a small bench carved from a rock. It is said that the rock fell from the mountain, burying two lovers that were embracing on that place. A document from 1817 mentions the story, giving the name of the woman killed by the rock as Ana Maria.

=== Orașul Stalin ===
On August 19, 1946, there was a big fire on Tâmpa, that burned out parts of the forest covering the mountain. In the early 1950s, after Brașov was renamed Orașul Stalin (see List of places named after Stalin), the authorities started planting fir trees, so that the word "STALIN" would be clearly visible from the city. Over the years, vegetation has blurred the word made out by the trees. Yet, to this day (especially in the winter), one may still distinguish the marking "ALIN" when coming on the road from the Burzenland.

== In popular culture ==
The soccer team FC Brașov is nicknamed Diavolii de sub Tâmpa (The Tâmpa Devils).

== Image gallery ==
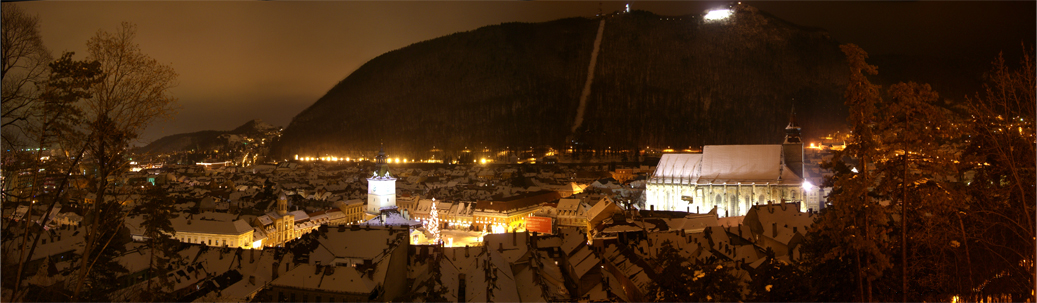
Tampa by night - panorama

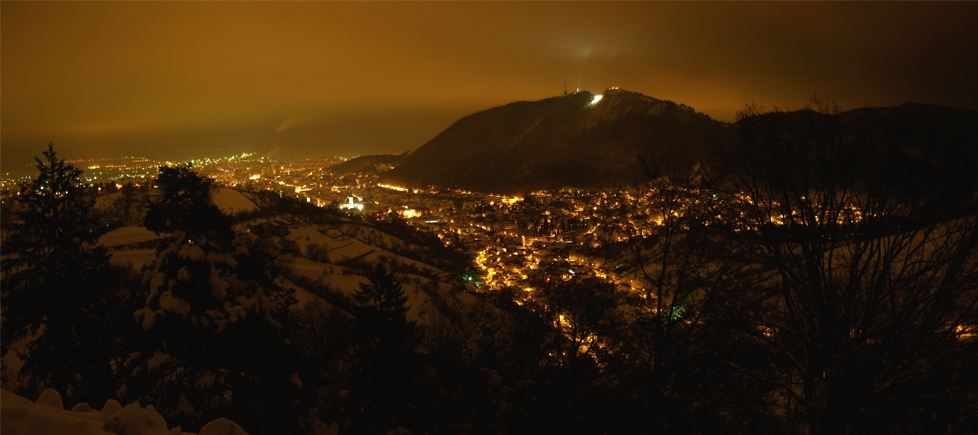
Tampa by night - panorama 2

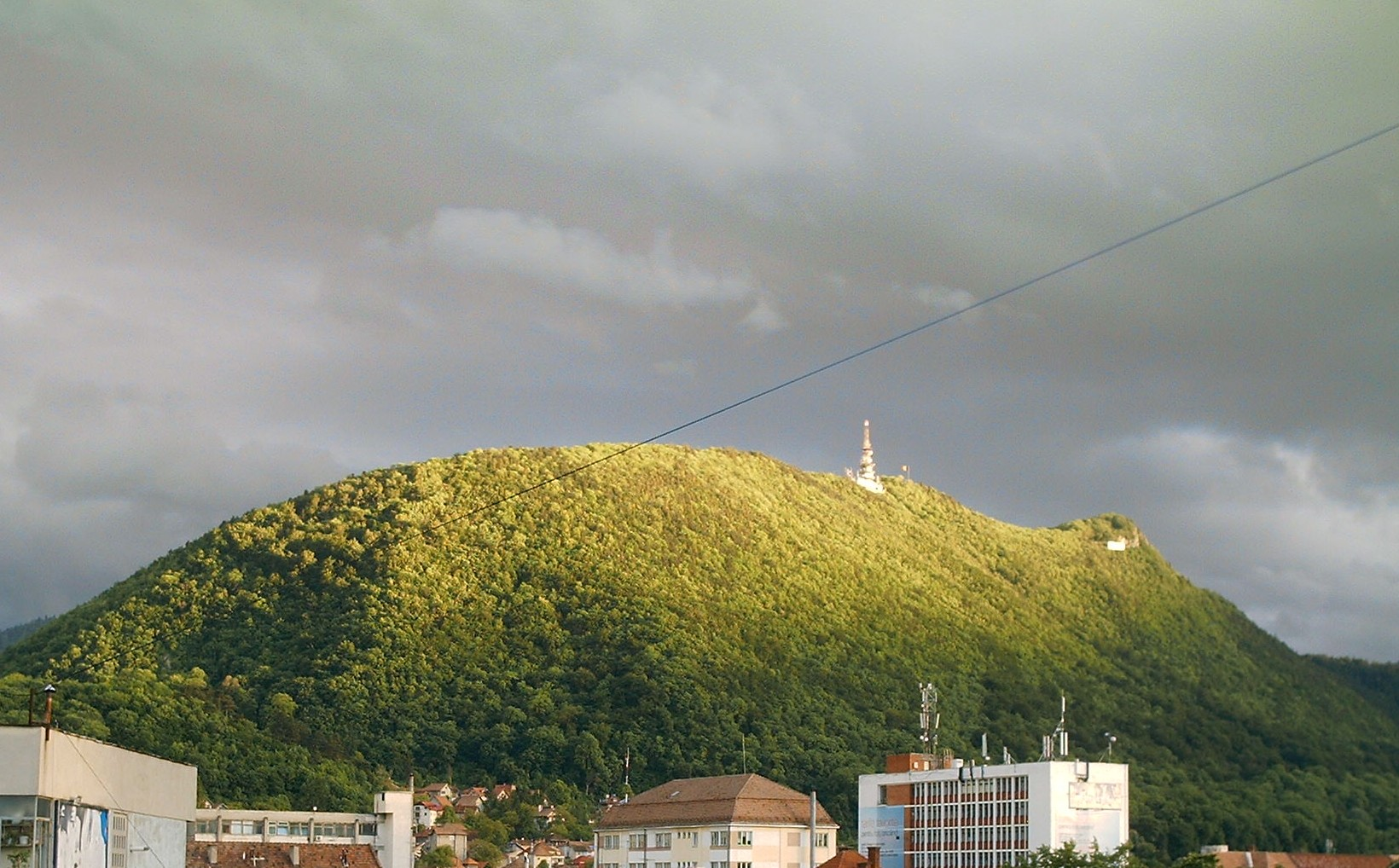
Tâmpa bathed in light during summer...

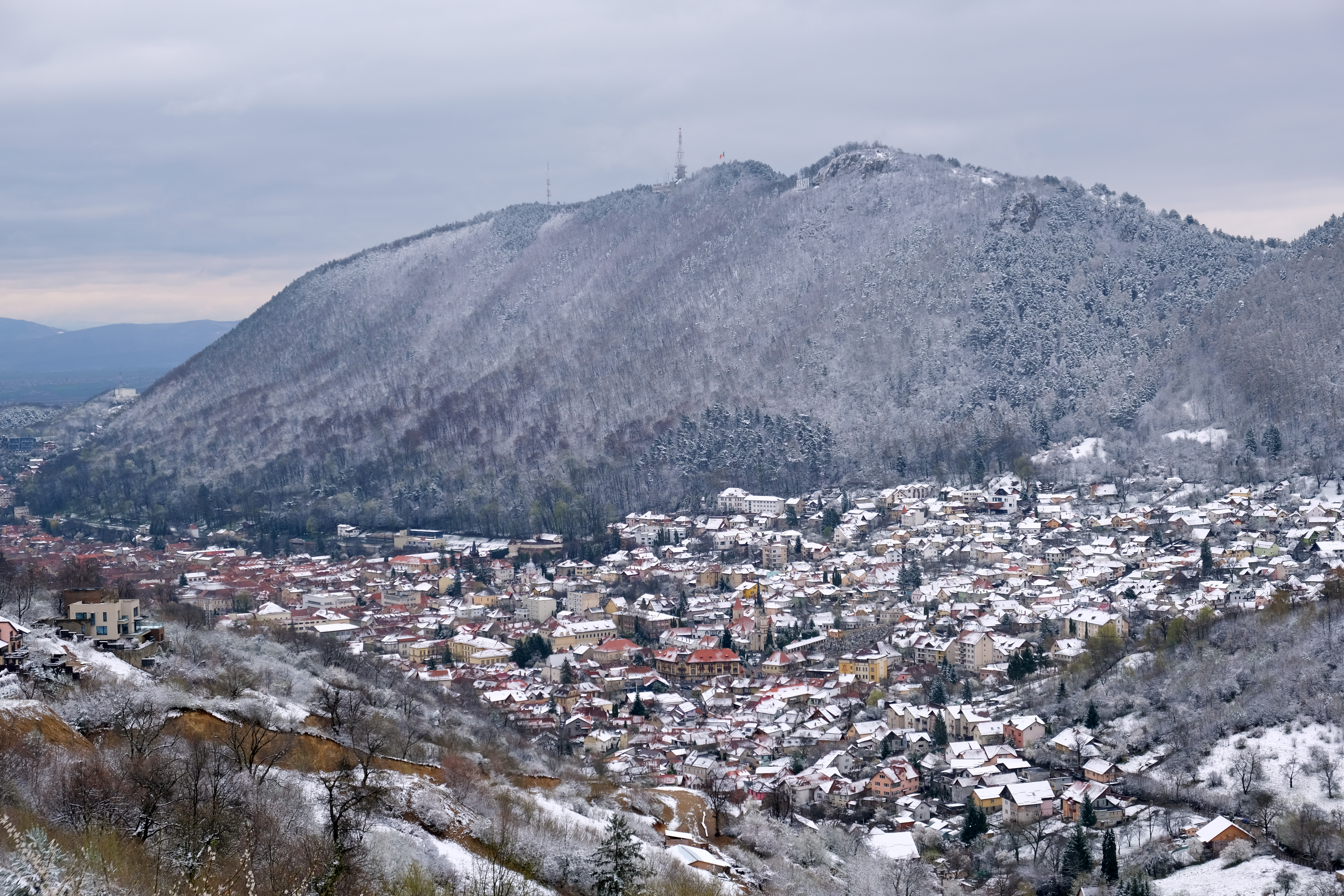
...winter...

Brașov as seen from the summit of Tâmpa

== Bibliography ==
- Brașovul de altădată — Sextil Pușcariu, Ed. Dacia, Cluj-Napoca, 1977
- Brașov • ghid turistic — Silviu Pop, Ștefan Princz, Ed. Pentru Turism, Bucharest, 1974
- Zalmoxis - Tempus - Corona, Florin Olteanu, in Karpaten Rundschau, nr. 38-1587-/24.IX.1982
