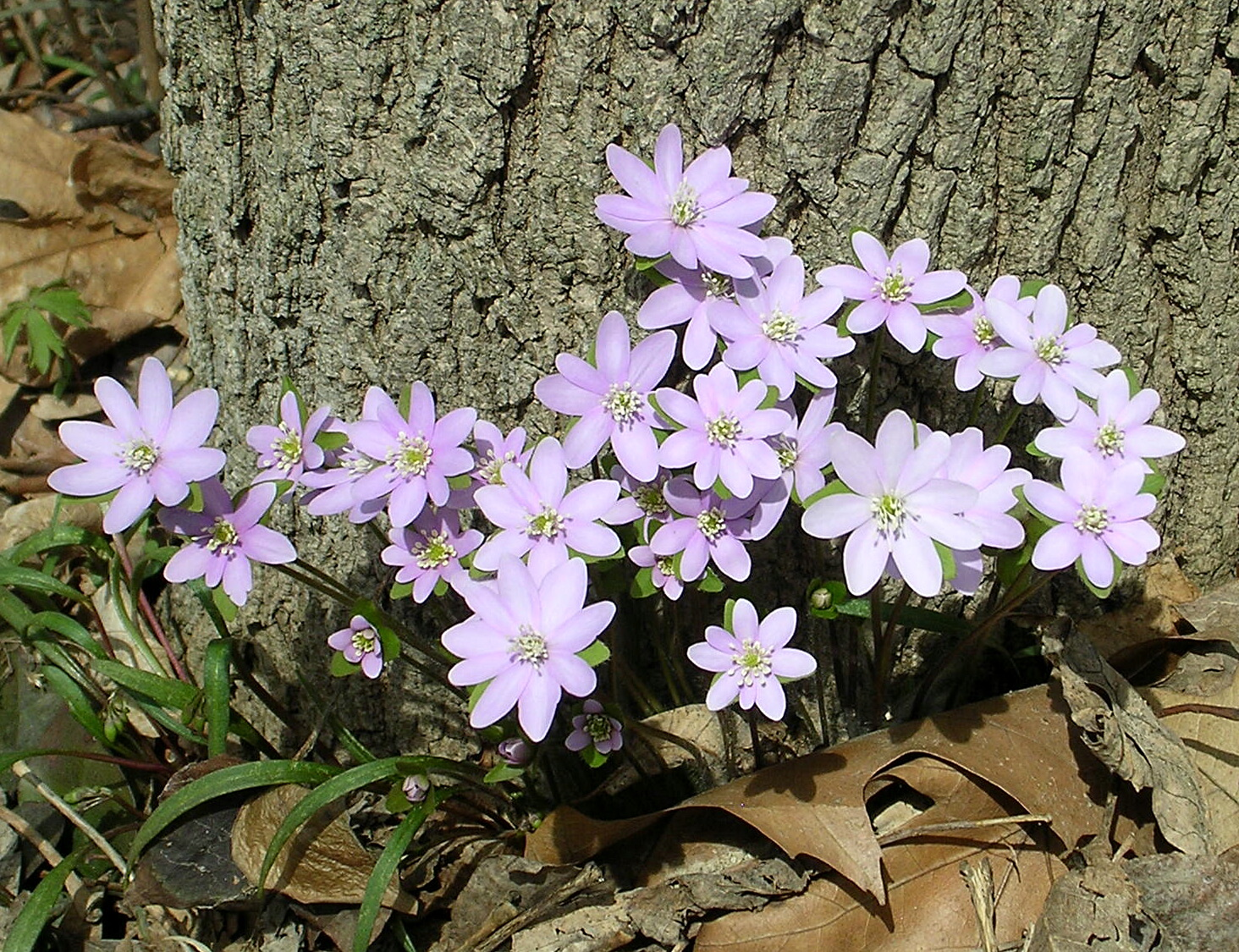

Scientific classification
- Kingdom: Plantae
- Clade: Tracheophytes
- Clade: Angiosperms
- Clade: Eudicots
- Order: Ranunculales
- Family: Ranunculaceae
- Genus: Hepatica
- Species: H. acutiloba

Binomial name
- Hepatica acutiloba DC.

= Hepatica acutiloba =

Species of flowering plant

Hepatica acutiloba, the sharp-lobed hepatica, is a herbaceous flowering plant in the buttercup family Ranunculaceae. It is sometimes considered part of the genus Anemone, as Anemone acutiloba, A. hepatica, or A. nobilis.

Each clump-forming plant grows 5 to 19 cm (2.0 to 7.5 in) tall, flowering in the early to mid spring. The flowers are greenish-white, white, purple or pinkish in color, with a rounded shape. After flowering the fruits are produced in small, rounded columned heads, on pedicels 1 to 4 mm long. When the fruits, called achenes, are ripe they are ovoid in shape, 3.5–4.7 mm long and 1.3–1.9 mm wide, slightly winged and tend to lack a beak.

Hepatica acutiloba is native to central eastern North America where it can be found growing in deciduous open woods, most often in calcareous soils.

== Historical uses ==
Among the Cherokee Indians, the plant was formerly used to cure coughs, either in tea or by chewing its root.

== Gallery ==
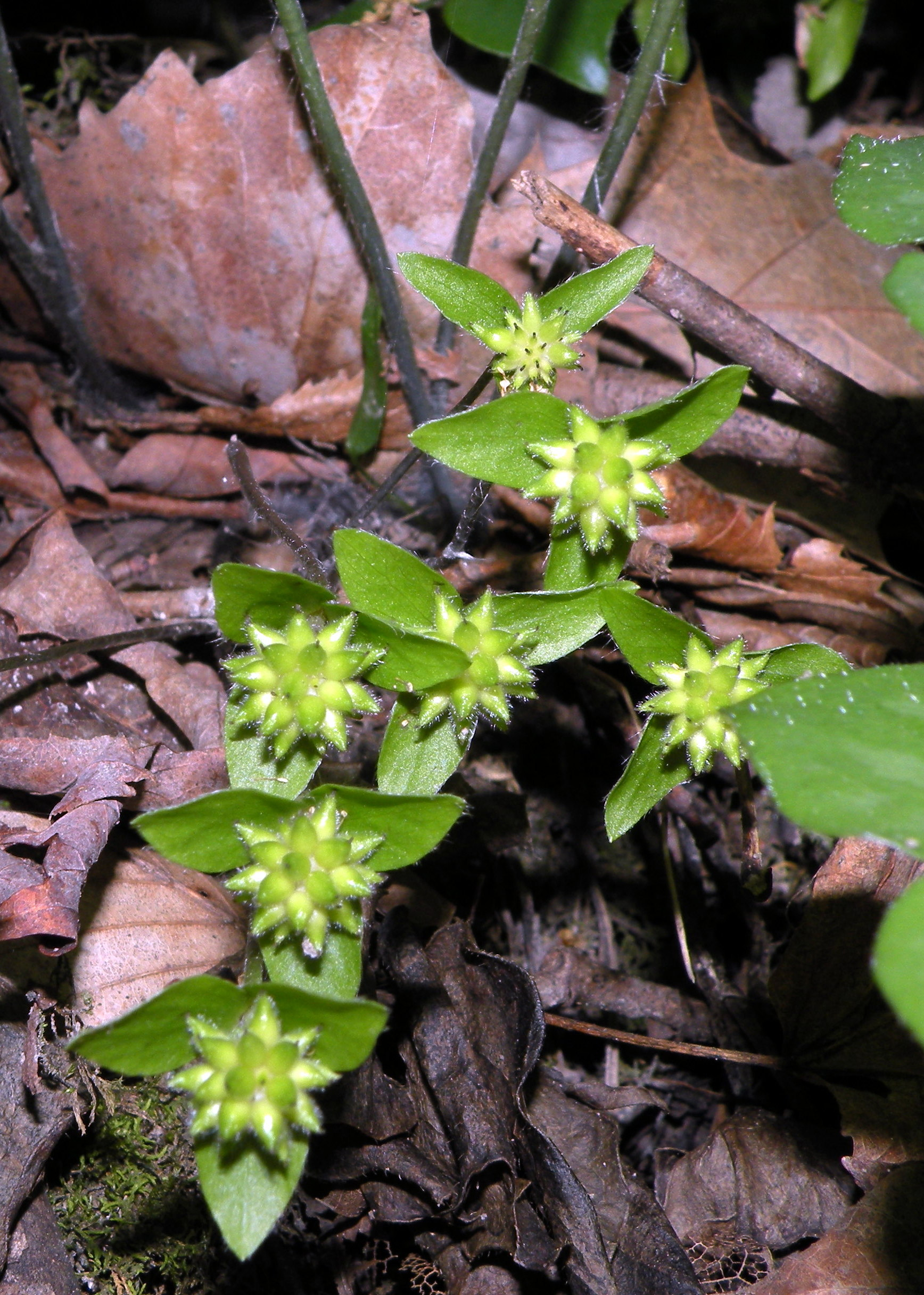
Fruiting H. acutiloba in Willsboro, New York

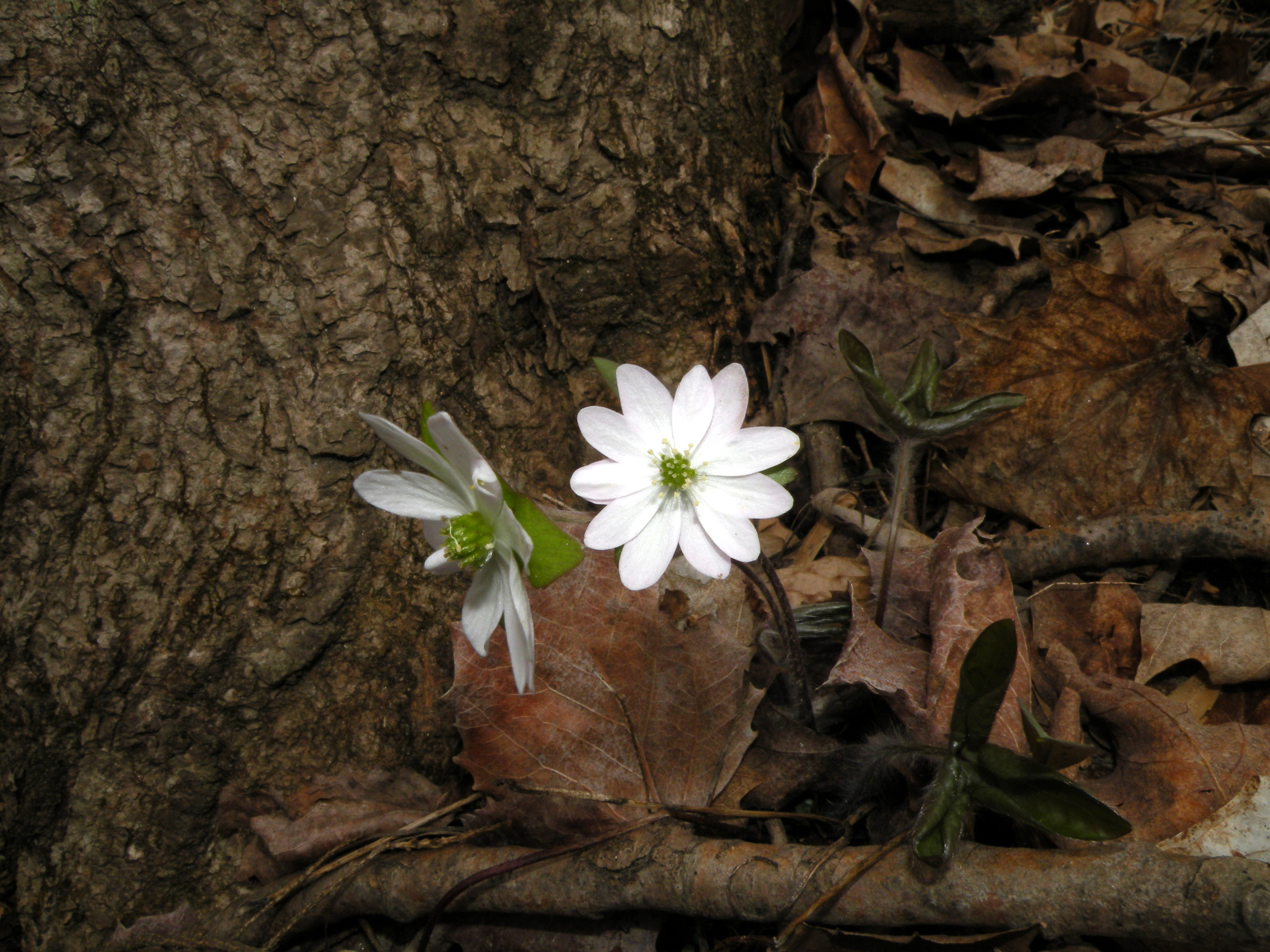
H. acutiloba in North Canaan, Connecticut

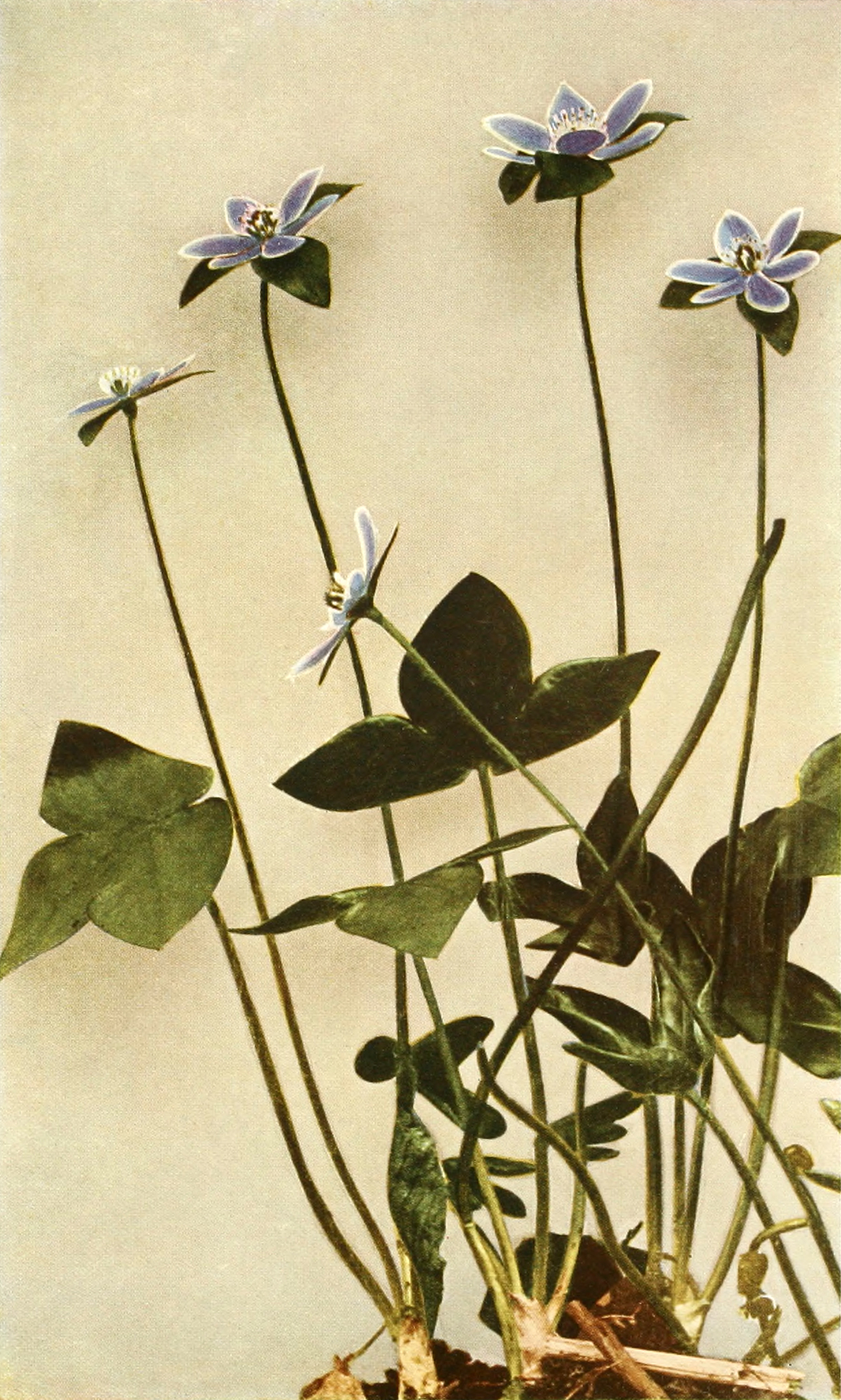
H. acutiloba plate in Wildflowers of New York (1918)
