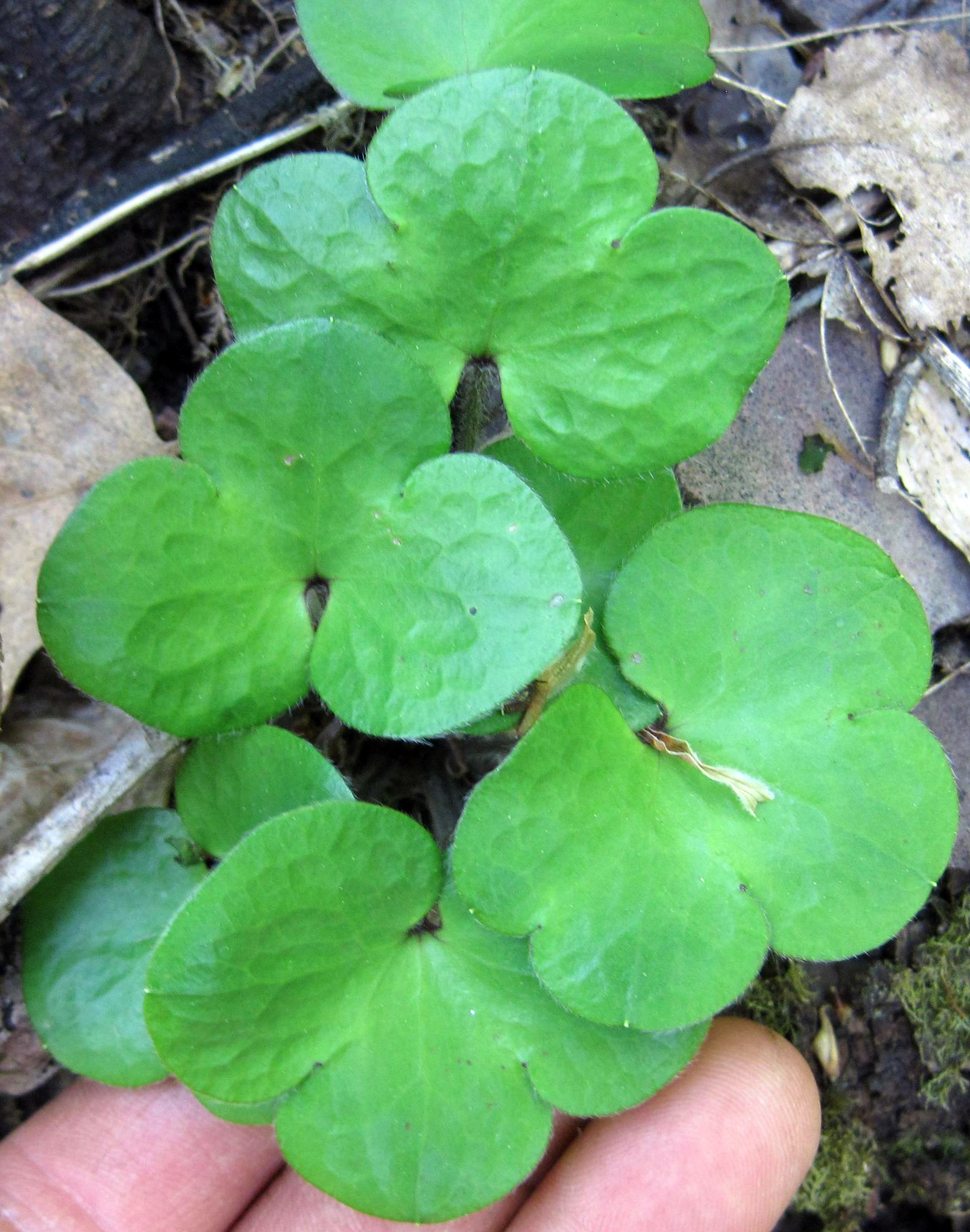

Scientific classification
- Kingdom: Plantae
- Clade: Tracheophytes
- Clade: Angiosperms
- Clade: Eudicots
- Order: Ranunculales
- Family: Ranunculaceae
- Genus: Hepatica
- Species: H. americana

Binomial name
- Hepatica americana (DC.) Ker Gawl.

= Hepatica americana =

Species of flowering plant

Hepatica americana, the round-lobed hepatica, is a herbaceous flowering plant in the buttercup family Ranunculaceae. It is native to the eastern United States and Canada.

It is sometimes considered part of the genus Anemone, as Anemone americana, A. hepatica, or A. nobilis.
