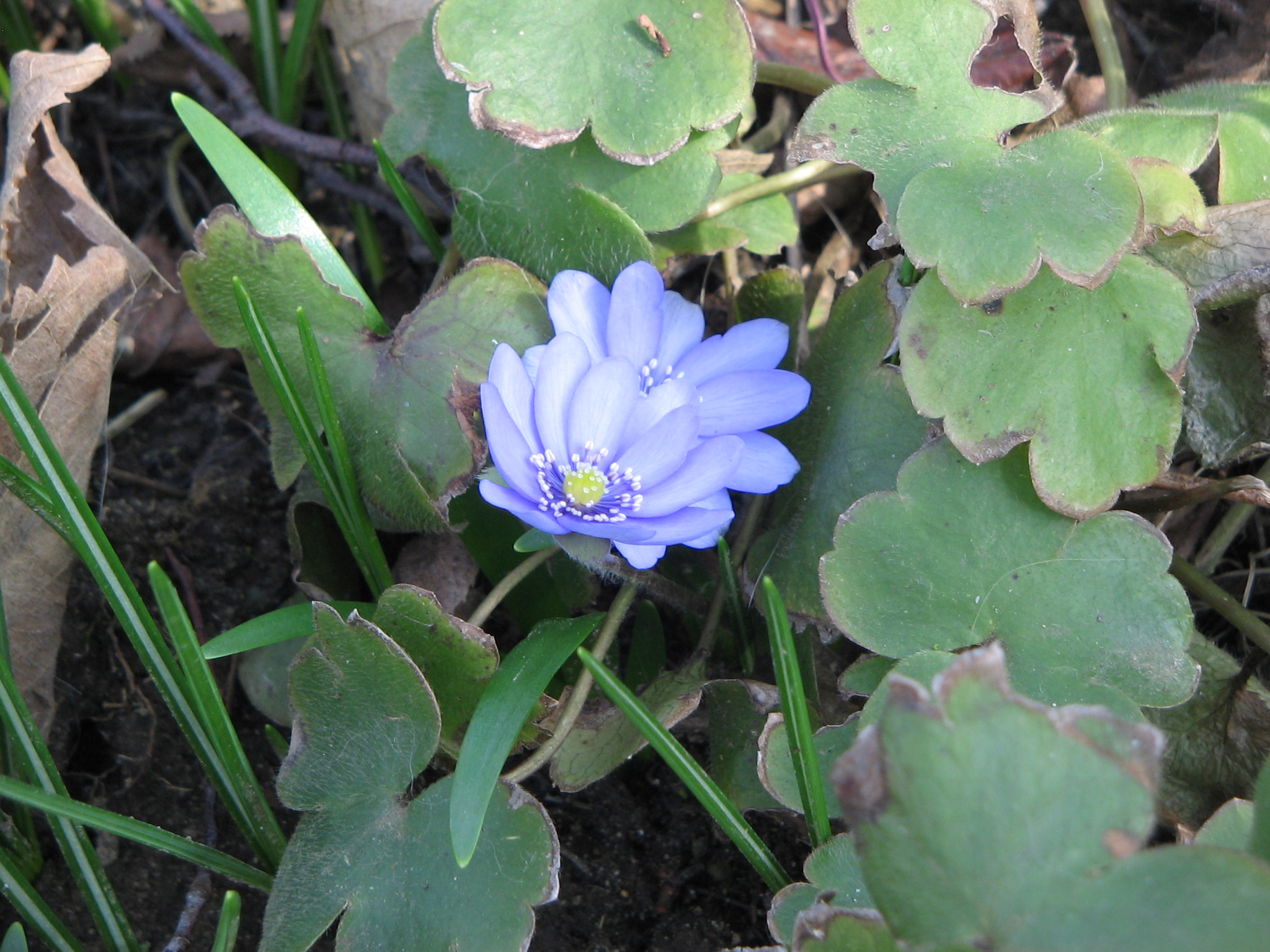
- Flowers and foliage
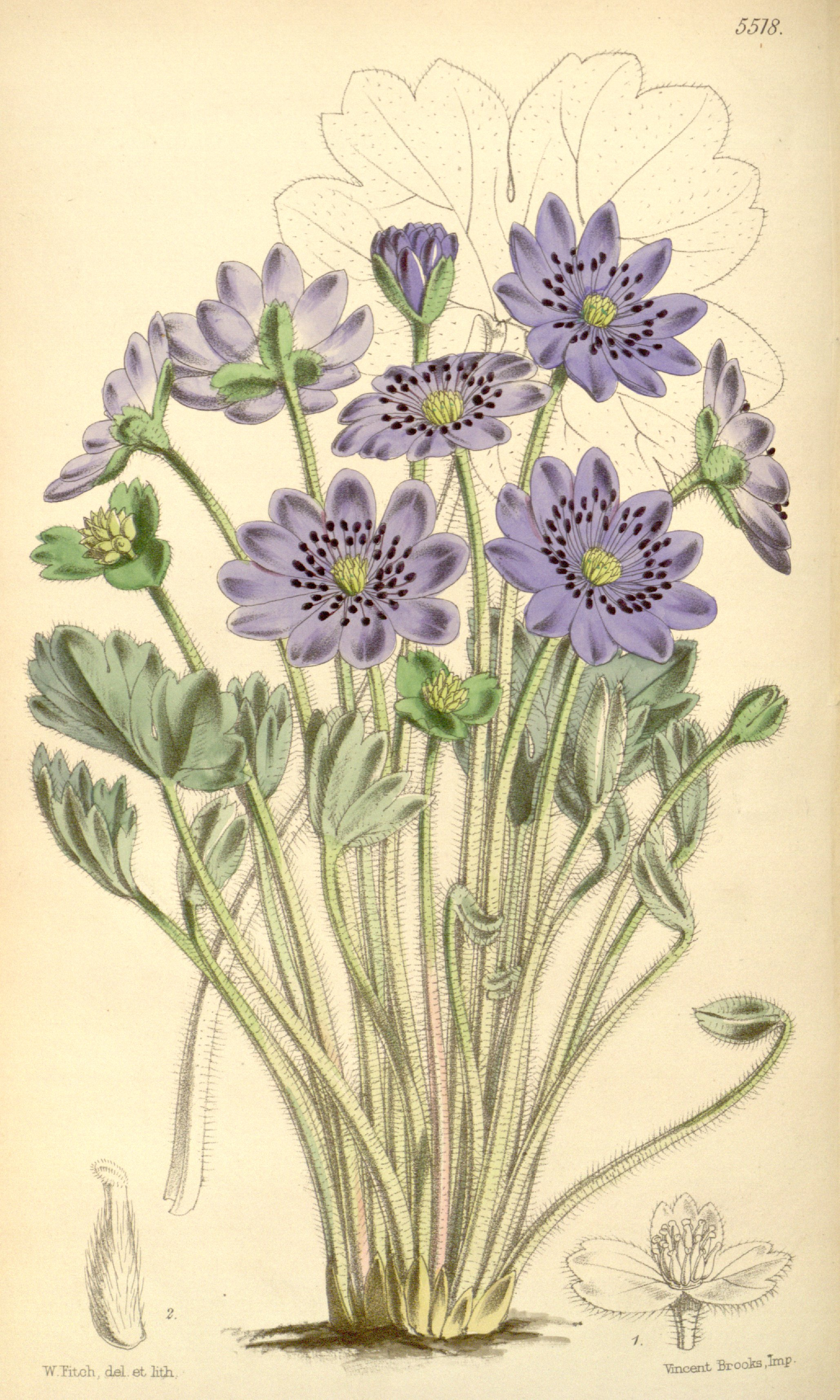
- Botanical illustration

Scientific classification
- Kingdom: Plantae
- Clade: Embryophytes
- Clade: Tracheophytes
- Clade: Angiosperms
- Clade: Eudicots
- Order: Ranunculales
- Family: Ranunculaceae
- Genus: Hepatica
- Species: H. transsilvanica

Binomial name
- Hepatica transsilvanica Fuss

Synonyms
- Anemone transsilvanica (Fuss) Heuff.; Hepatica multiloba Schur

= Hepatica transsilvanica =

Species of flowering plant

Hepatica transsilvanica, called the large blue hepatica, is a species of flowering plant in the genus Hepatica, native to the Carpathian Mountains of Romania. It has gained the Royal Horticultural Society's Award of Garden Merit.

== Evolutionary history ==
Hepatica transsilvanica has an evolutionary origin as a hybrid species. Molecular phylogenetics studies have confirmed that it is an allotetraploid, meaning it formed when two different parent species hybridized, and the chromosome count doubled. Its maternal parent is Hepatica nobilis, a widespread European species with entirely lobed leaves, while its paternal parent is Hepatica falconeri, a diploid species native to Central Asia with crenate (scalloped) leaves.

This hybrid origin is evidenced by several lines of genetic research. Analysis of nuclear DNA sequences shows patterns consistent with contributions from both parent species, while the plant's plastid DNA (inherited maternally) closely matches that of H. nobilis. The hybrid nature is further supported by the plant's intermediate leaf morphology and its tetraploid chromosome count (n=28), compared to the diploid count (2n=14) of H. nobilis.

Dating analyses suggest this hybridization event occurred about 3 million years ago, during the late Pliocene epoch. This makes H. transsilvanica substantially older than many European plant species, with its origin predating the major Quaternary glaciation cycles that reshaped much of Europe's flora.

== Biogeography ==
Hepatica transsilvanica has significant biogeographical importance due to its restricted distribution and ancient lineage. Unlike its widespread parent H. nobili, it is found only in the Southeastern Carpathians of Romania, where it has persisted for millions of years.

This restricted distribution pattern provides compelling evidence that the Southeastern Carpathians functioned as a cryptic refugium—an area where ancient plant lineages could survive despite dramatic climate changes. While much of Europe's Tertiary flora was eradicated during the Quaternary ice ages, H. transsilvanica managed to persist in this protected region.

The plant belongs to a group of "dacian" endemic species (named after the ancient Dacian region) centred on Transylvania that includes other notable plants like Symphytum cordatum, Pulmonaria rubra, and Dentaria glandulosa. The long-term survival of H. transsilvanica in a single region demonstrates the critical role that mountain ranges can play in preserving ancient evolutionary lineages during periods of climate change.

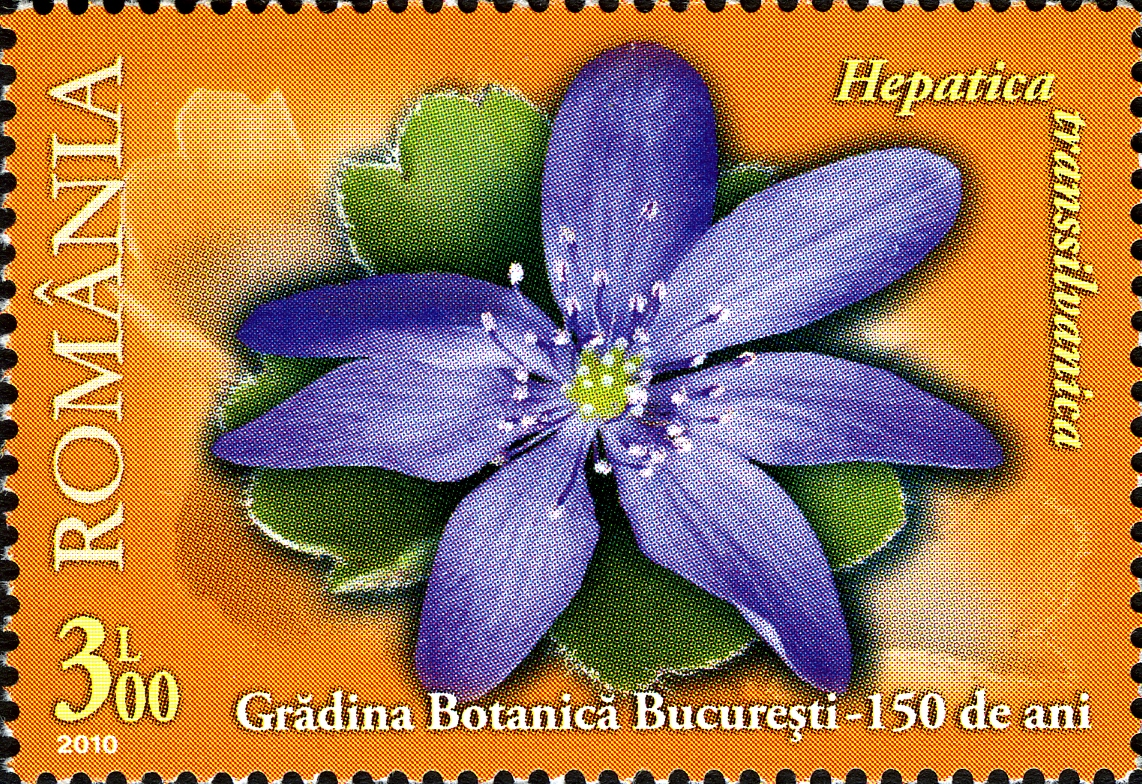
On a 2010 Romanian postage stamp

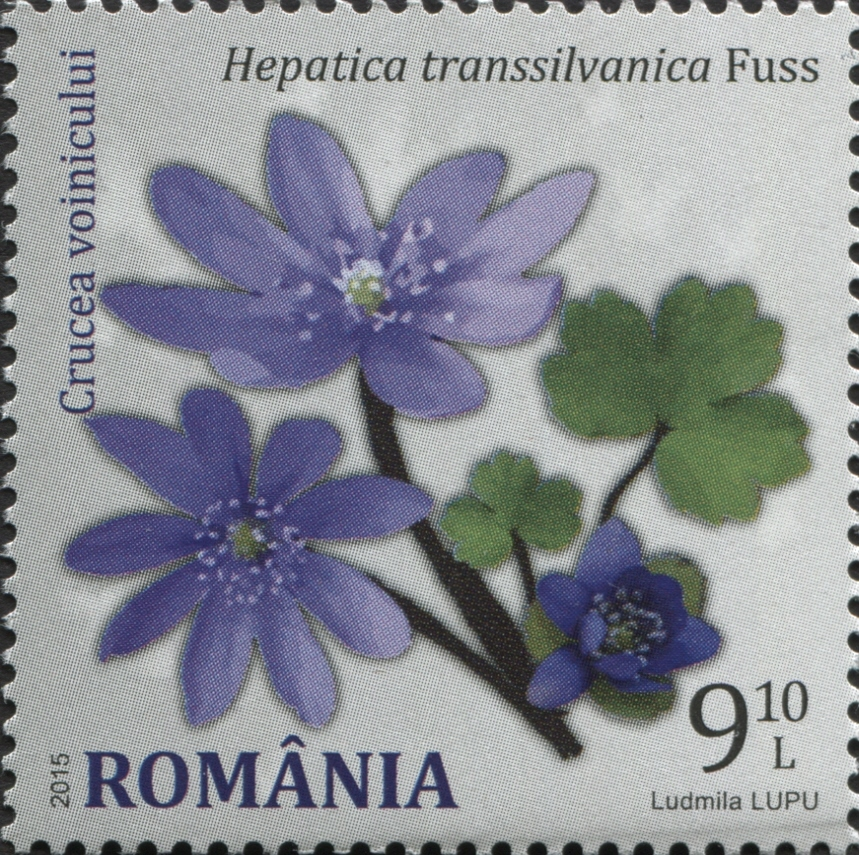
On a 2015 Romanian postage stamp
