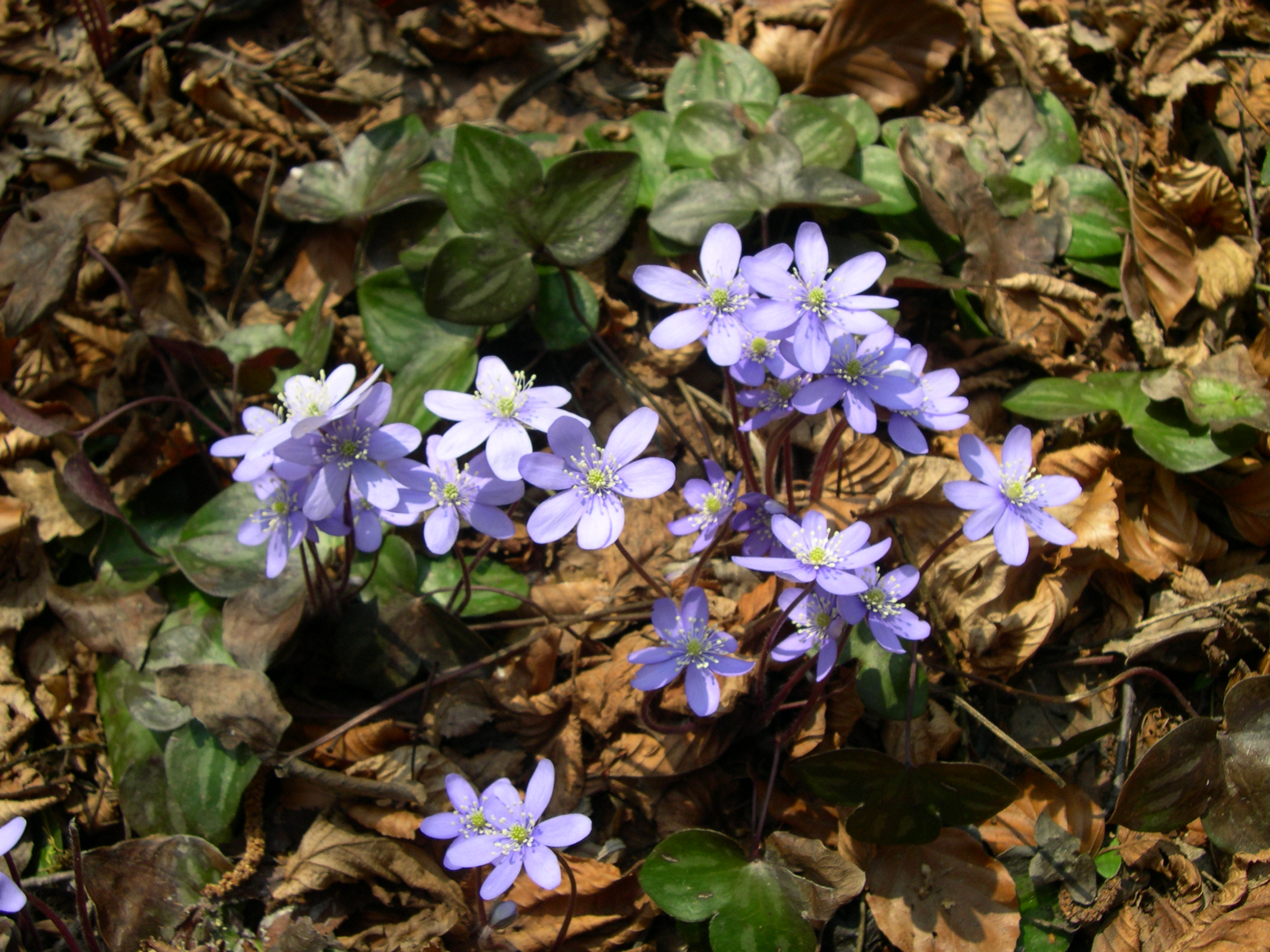
- Hepatica nobilis

Scientific classification
- Kingdom: Plantae
- Clade: Embryophytes
- Clade: Tracheophytes
- Clade: Spermatophytes
- Clade: Angiosperms
- Clade: Eudicots
- Order: Ranunculales
- Family: Ranunculaceae
- Subfamily: Ranunculoideae
- Tribe: Anemoneae
- Genus: Hepatica; Mill.

Synonyms
- Isopyrum Adans.

= Hepatica =

Genus of flowering plants in the buttercup family

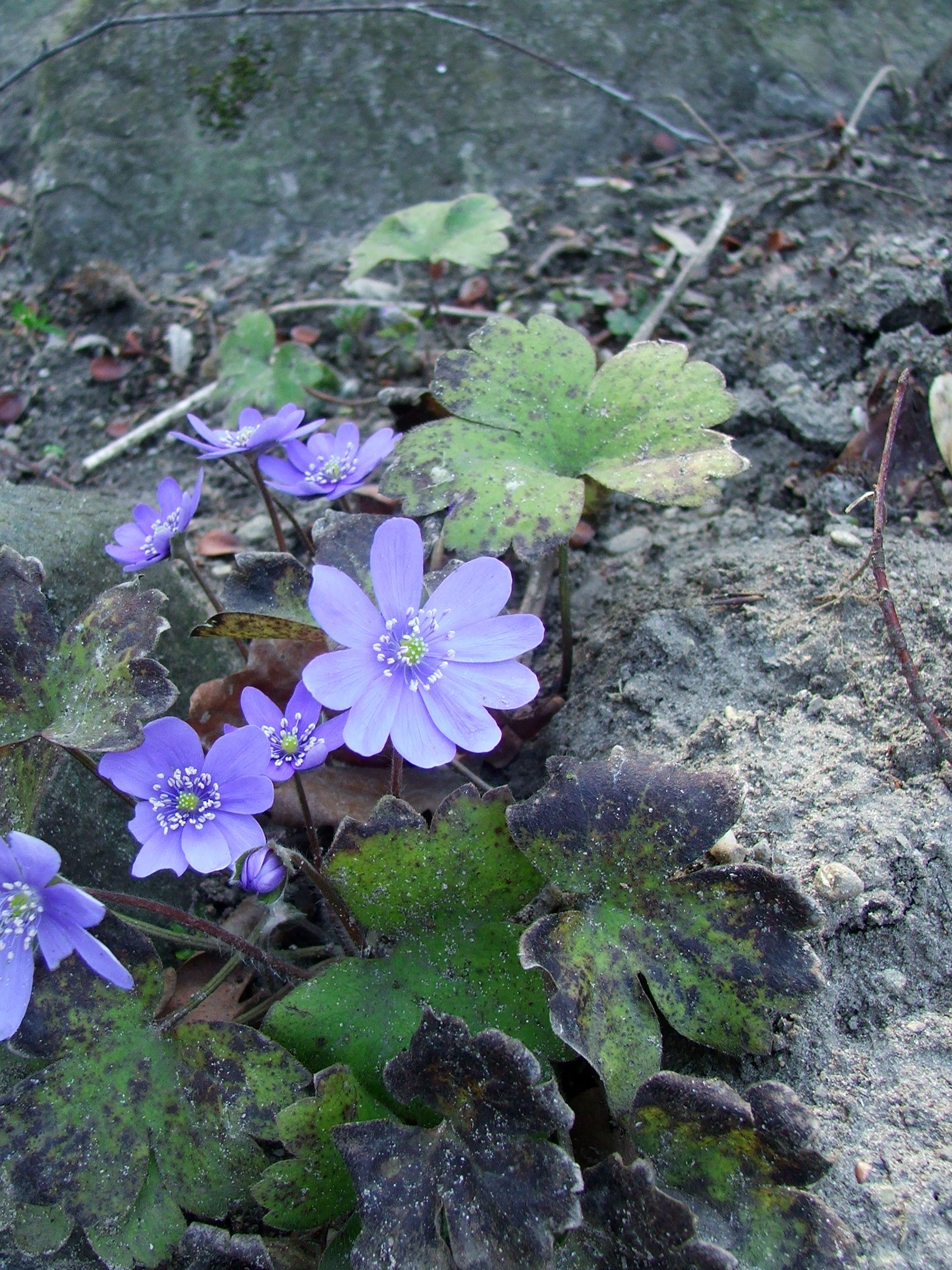
Hepatica transsilvanica

Hepatica (hepatica, liverleaf, or liverwort) is a genus of herbaceous perennials in the buttercup family, native to central and northern Europe, Asia and eastern North America. Some botanists include Hepatica within a wider interpretation of Anemone.

== Description ==
Bisexual flowers with pink, purple, blue, or white sepals and three green bracts appear singly on hairy stems from late winter to spring. Butterflies, moths, bees, flies and beetles are known pollinators.

The leaves are basal, leathery, and usually three-lobed, remaining over winter.

== Taxonomy ==
Hepatica was described by the English botanist Philip Miller in 1754. It was proposed as a subgenus of Anemone in 1836, but later segregated into genus Hepatica.

=== Taxa ===
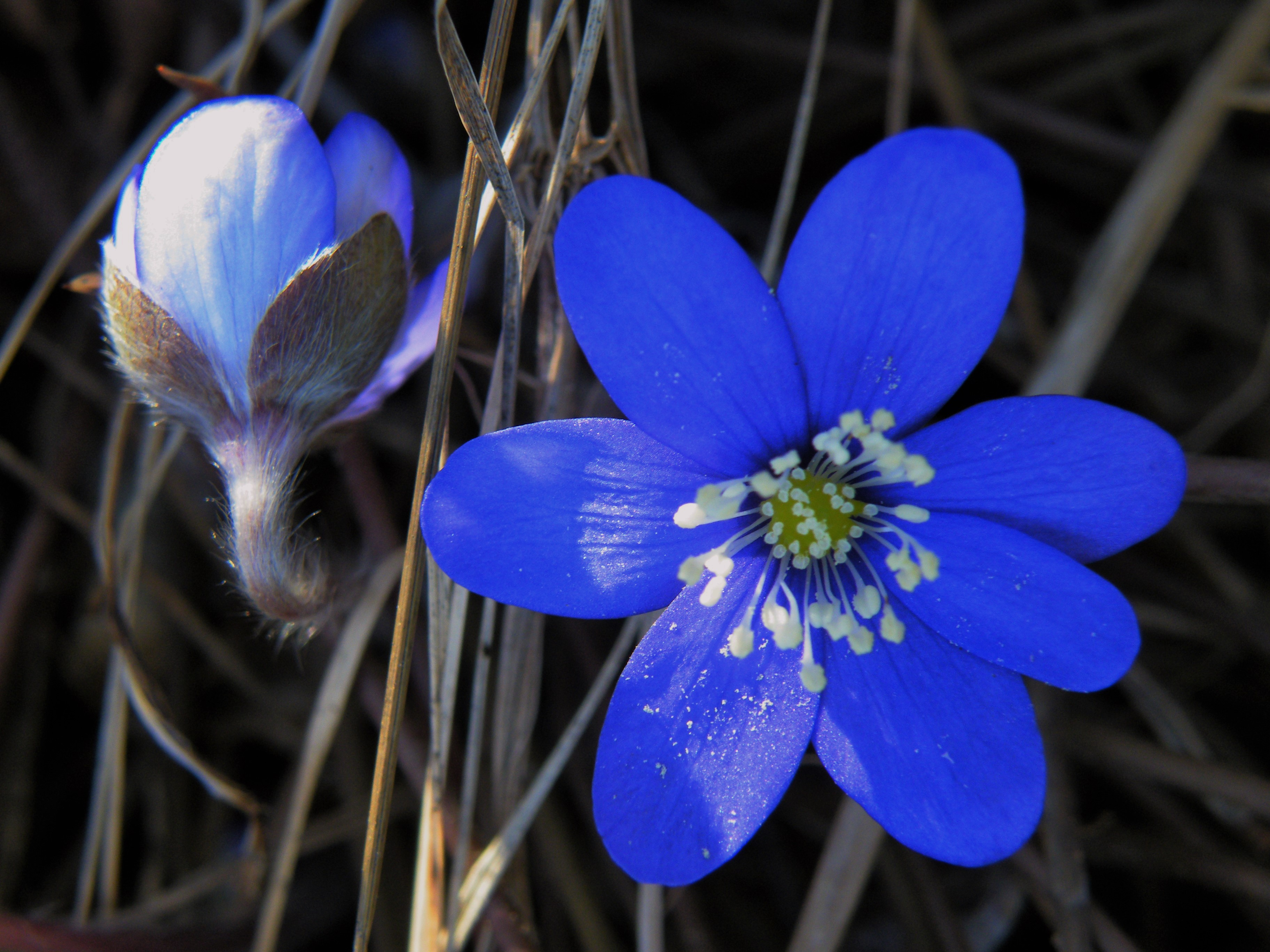
Hepatica nobilis flowers

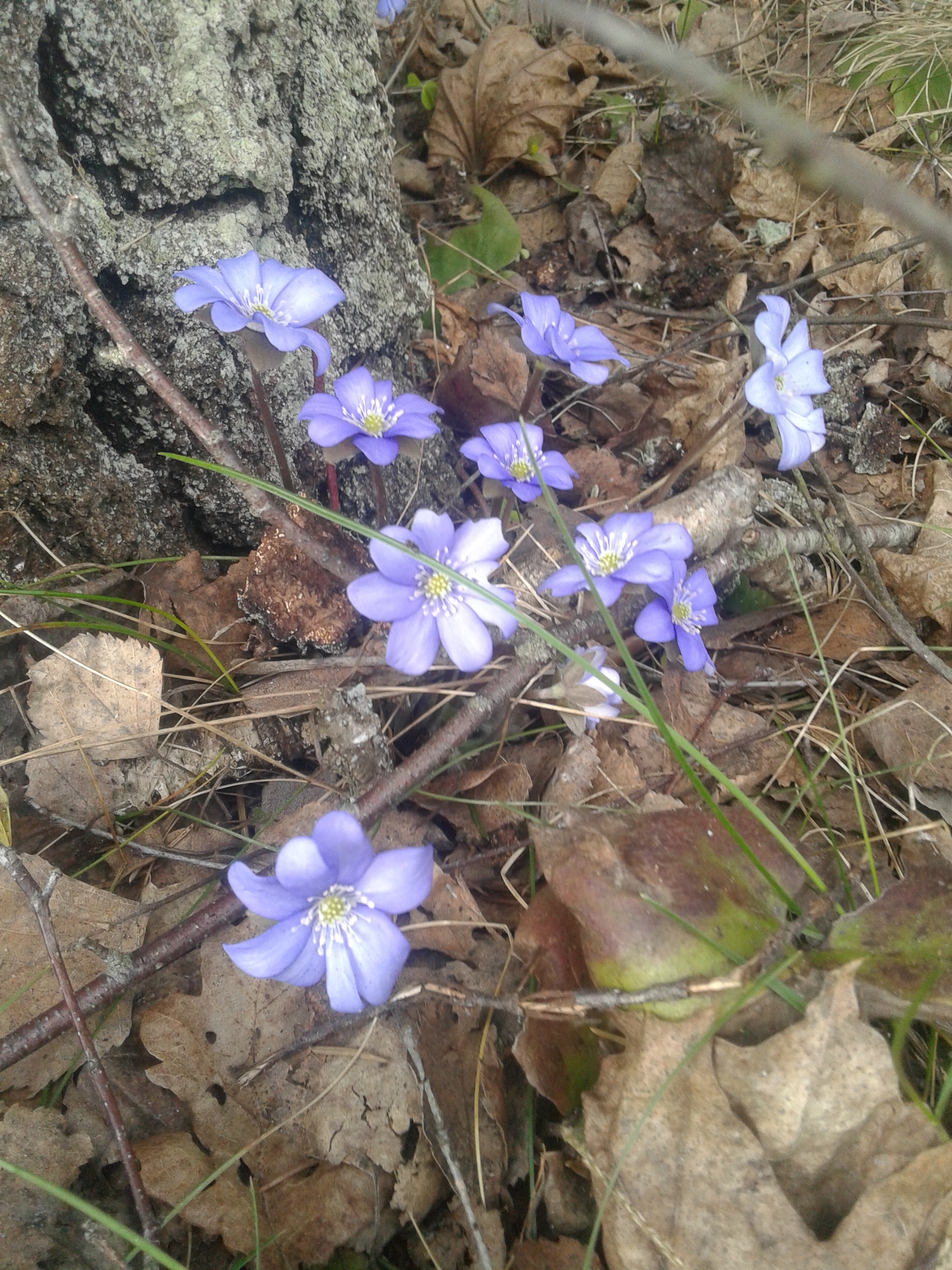
Hepatica in Europos Parkas, Lithuania

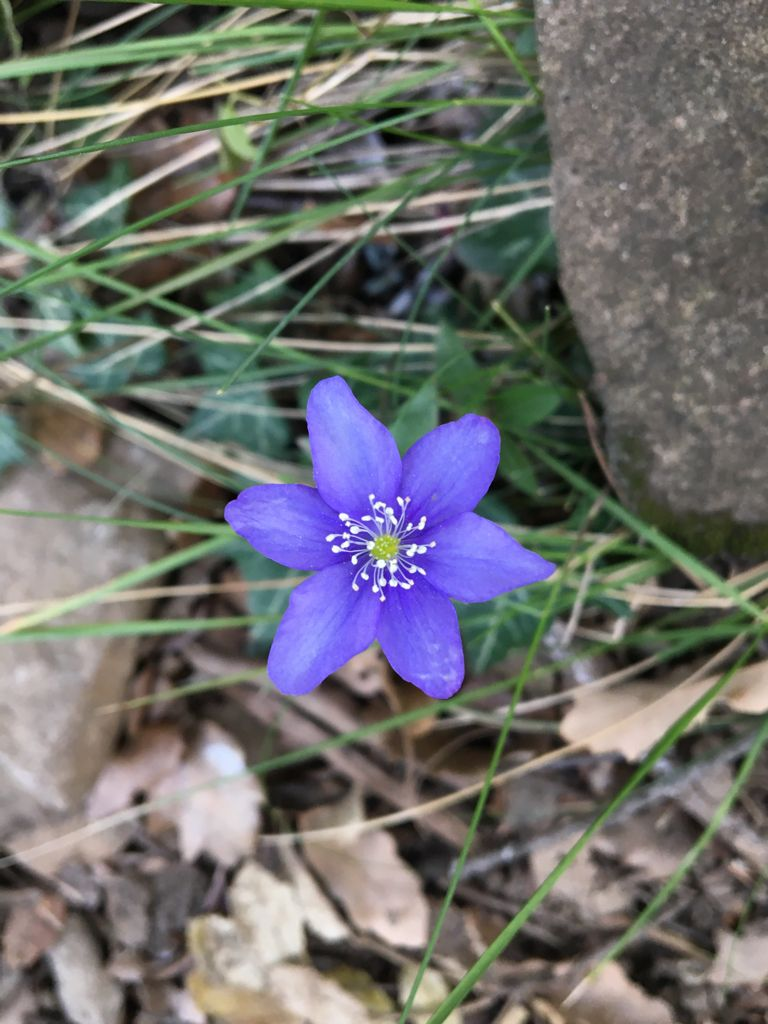
Hepatica nobilis in Aínsa, Spain

As of January 2021, Kew's Plants of the World Online (POWO) accepts 7 species and one hybrid in the genus Hepatica:

- Hepatica acutiloba DC.
  - Synonym: Anemone acutiloba (DC.) G.Lawson
  - Synonym: Hepatica nobilis var. acuta (Pursh) Steyerm.
- Hepatica americana (DC.) Ker Gawl.
  - Synonym: Anemone americana (DC.) H.Hara
  - Synonym: Hepatica nobilis var. obtusa (Pursh) Steyerm.
- Hepatica falconeri (Thomson) Steward
- Hepatica henryi (Oliv.) Steward
  - Synonym: Hepatica yamatutai Nakai
- Hepatica maxima (Nakai) Nakai
- Hepatica × media Simonk.
- Hepatica nobilis Schreb.
  - Synonym: Anemone hepatica L.
- Hepatica transsilvanica Fuss
  - Synonym: Anemone transsilvanica (Fuss) Heuff.

One infraspecific taxon is also recognized by POWO:

- Hepatica nobilis var. japonica Nakai
  - Synonym: Hepatica asiatica Nakai
  - Synonym: Hepatica insularis Nakai

Hepatica can be divided into two series with respect to leaf edge:

==== Series Triloba ====
The leaves of the series Triloba Ulbr. Tamura: are three-lobed with a smooth leaf edge.

- Hepatica acutiloba: Eastern Canada, Midwestern United States, Eastern United States
- Hepatica americana: Central Canada, Eastern Canada, Midwestern United States, Eastern United States
- Hepatica maxima: endemic to Ulleung-do island (South Korea)
- Hepatica nobilis:
  - Hepatica nobilis var. nobilis: Europe to Western Siberia
  - Hepatica nobilis var. japonica: Russian Far East, North China, Central China, East China, Korea, and Japan (Honshu, Shikoku, north of Kyushu island)

==== Series Angulosa ====
The leaves of series Angulosa (Ulbr.) Tamura are three- to five-lobed with a crenate leaf edge.

- Hepatica falconeri — Mountain forests of Central Asia; India: Northwest Himalayas (Himachal Pradesh, Jammu and Kashmir); Northwest China (Tienshan); Kyrgyzstan and Tajikistan (Pamir-Alai); North Pakistan, Kazakhstan (North Tienshan)
- Hepatica henryi: North Central China, South Central China (western Hubei, northern Hunan, Sichuan, Shaanxi)
- Hepatica × media: Romania
- Hepatica transsilvanica: Romania (Carpathian Mountains, Transylvania)

=== Etymology ===
The word hepatica derives from the Greek ἡπατικός hēpatikós, from ἧπαρ hêpar 'liver', because its three-lobed leaf was thought to resemble the human liver.

== Distribution ==
Plants of genus Hepatica are native to Europe, Asia, and North America.

- Europe: Albania, Austria, the Baltic states, Belarus, Bulgaria, Corsica, Czechoslovakia, Denmark, European Russia, Finland, France, Germany, Greece, Hungary, Italy, Norway, Poland, Romania, Spain, Sweden, Switzerland, Ukraine, Yugoslavia
- Central Asia: Kazakhstan, Kyrgyzstan, Tajikistan, Western Siberia
- Eastern Asia: North China, South Central China, East China, Japan, Korea, Manchuria, Primorsky Krai
- South Asia: Pakistan, Western Himalaya
- Canada: Manitoba, New Brunswick, Nova Scotia, Ontario, Québec
- United States: Alabama, Arkansas, Connecticut, Delaware, District of Columbia, Florida, Georgia, Illinois, Indiana, Iowa, Kentucky, Maine, Maryland, Massachusetts, Michigan, Minnesota, Mississippi, Missouri, New Hampshire, New Jersey, New York, North Carolina, Ohio, Pennsylvania, Rhode Island, South Carolina, Tennessee, Vermont, Virginia, West Virginia, Wisconsin

Plants of the genus have been introduced to Belgium.

== Cultivation ==
Hepatica cultivation has been popular in Japan since the 18th century (mid-Edo period), where flowers with doubled petals and a range of colour patterns have been developed.

Noted for its tolerance of alkaline limestone-derived soils, Hepatica may grow in a wide range of conditions; it can be found either in deeply shaded deciduous (especially beech) woodland and scrub or grassland in full sun. Hepatica will also grow in both sandy and clay-rich substrates, being associated with limestone. Moist soil and winter snowfall are required; Hepatica is tolerant of winter snow cover, but less so of dry frost.

Propagation is done by seeds or by dividing vigorous clumps in spring. However, seedlings take several years to reach bloom size, and divided plants are slow to thicken.

== Uses ==
Hepatica was once used as a medicinal herb. Owing to the doctrine of signatures, the plant was once thought to be an effective treatment for liver disorders. Although poisonous in large doses, the leaves and flowers may be used as an astringent, as a demulcent for slow-healing injuries, and as a diuretic.

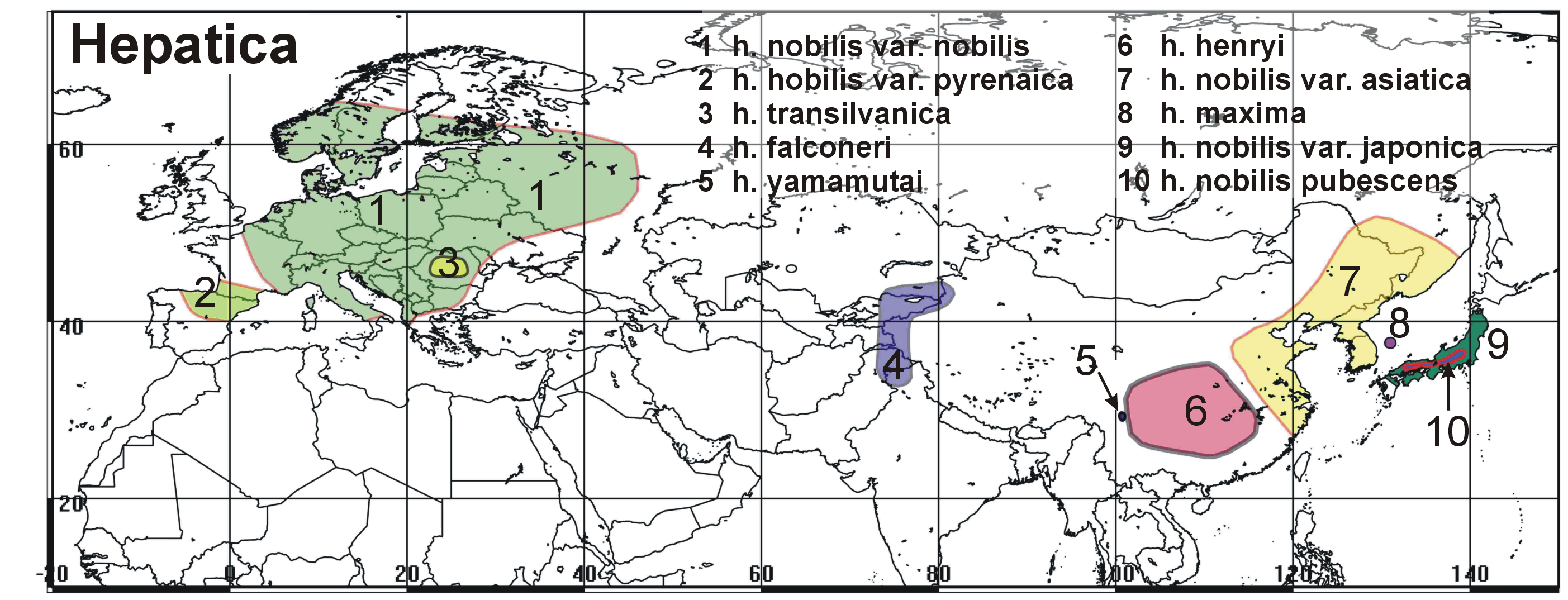
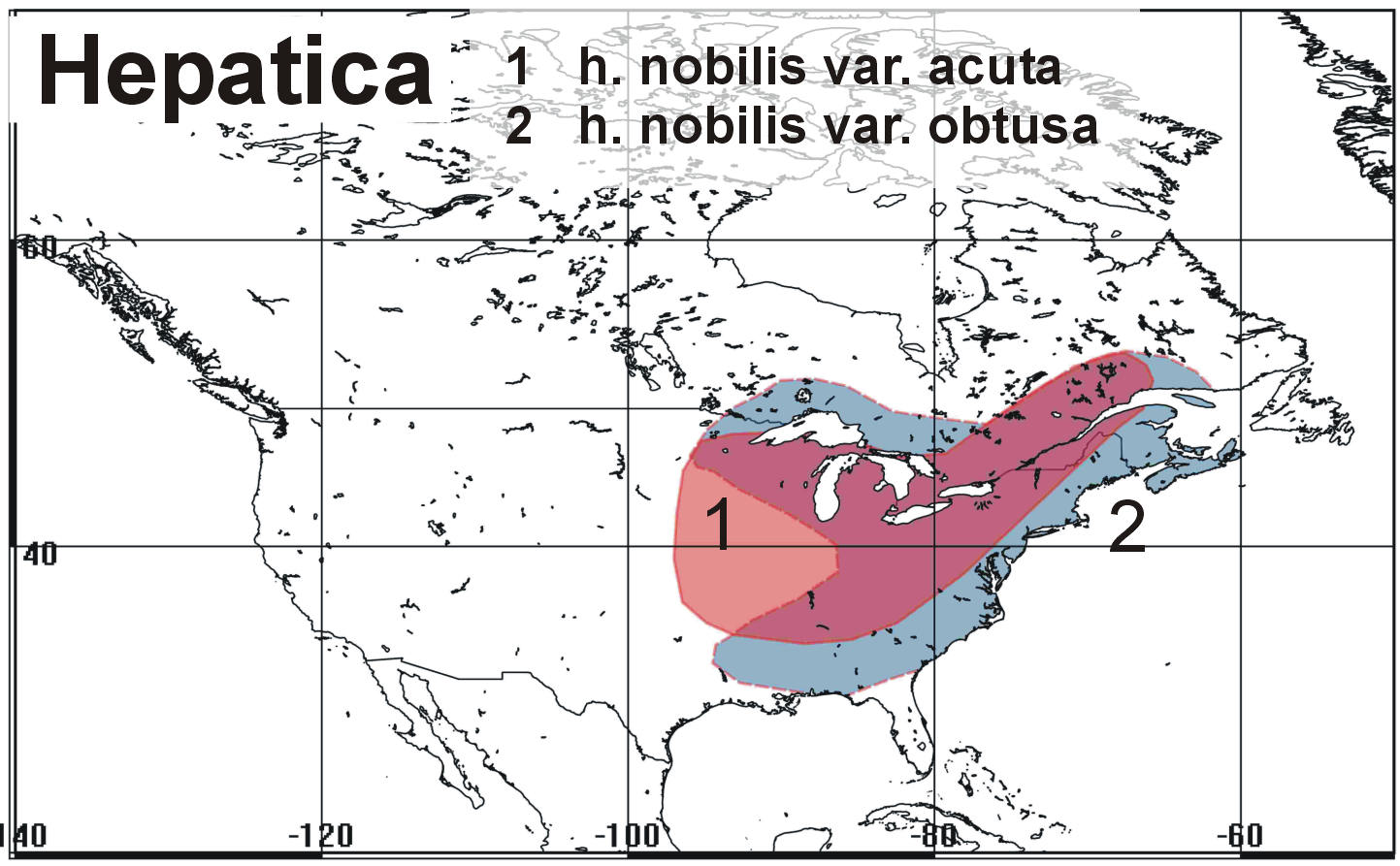
Distribution map of "Hepatica" in Europe, Asia and North America. (Try according to natural distribution given in the wikipedia pages)
