= Bouts =

Bouts is a surname. Notable people with the surname include:

- Dieric Bouts (c. 1415–1475), an early Netherlandish painter
  - Aelbrecht Bouts (c. 1452–1549), painter, son of Dieric
  - Dieric Bouts the Younger (1448–1491), painter, son of Dieric
- Jordy Bouts (born 1996), Belgian racing cyclist
- Paul Bouts, Belgian phrenologist and pedagogue
