= Flowers in a Wan-Li Vase =

Painting by Balthasar van der Ast in Aachen

- Flowers in a Wanli Vase
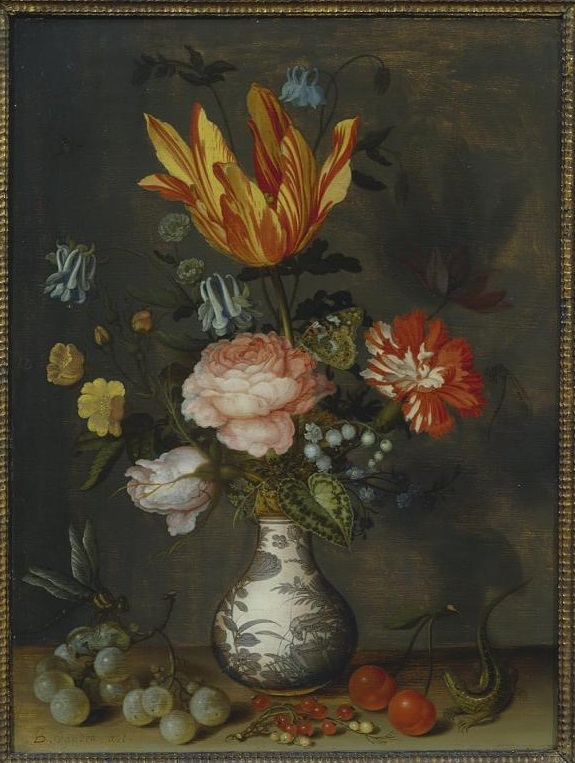
- Artist: Balthasar van der Ast
- Year: c. 1620s
- Medium: Oil on panel
- Dimensions: 36.6 cm (14.4 in) × 27.7 cm (10.9 in)
- Location: Suermondt-Ludwig-Museum
- Owner: Alice Tittel, Suermondt-Ludwig-Museum
- Collection: Suermondt-Ludwig-Museum
- Identifiers: RKDimages ID: 70105

Flowers in a Wan-Li Vase is a c. 1620s floral painting by Balthasar van der Ast in the collection of the Suermondt-Ludwig-Museum.

== Early history and creation ==
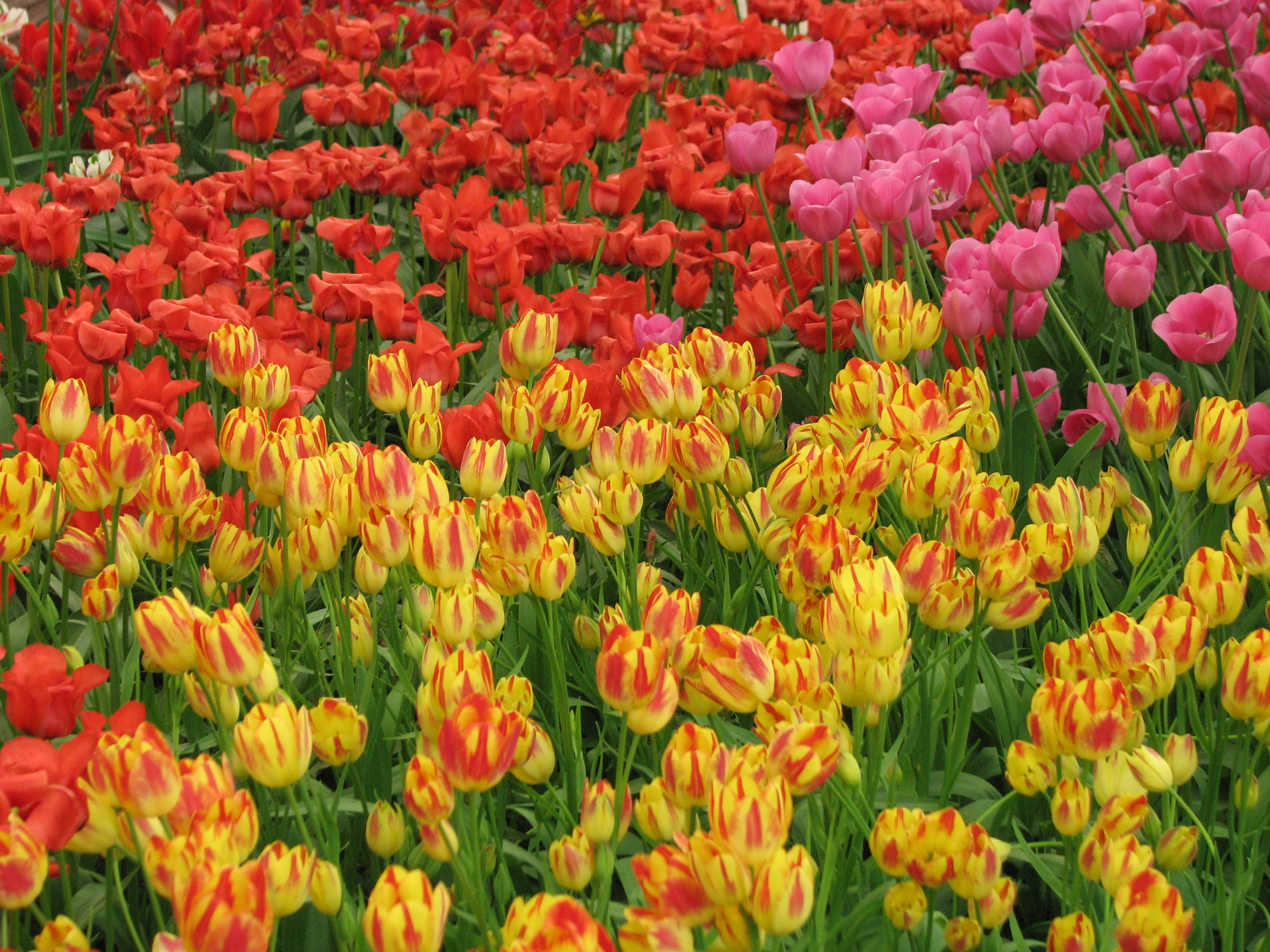
Flaming variety of tulip in the foreground, today a hardy variety and common enough for public garden planning

Balthasar van der Ast was a respected flower painter from Middelburg, active in Utrecht, and considered a member of the Bosschaert dynasty and one of the great flower painters of his time. Little is known about Van der Ast's workshop and whether or not he worked on commission. Even less is known of the early provenance of his paintings. Besides what can be learned from his surviving paintings, archival evidence indicates he was active in Utrecht at the same time as Roelant Savery.

The painting shows flowers of various seasons accompanied by various fauna in an arranged bouquet on a stone slab, often in an unusual vase, and in this case, a Chinese export porcelain vessel called a Wan-Li vase. This motief was not his invention and was already quite common among his colleagues, and would remain popular for over a century, with Jan van Huysum and Rachel Ruysch still enjoying high prices for their flower bouquets crawling with bugs and reptiles such as this one.

The flaming red and gold tulip at the top is a variety quite common in Dutch gardens today, but is actually suffering from the tulip breaking virus that gives it that "flaming" striped effect. This painting is symbolic of the popular appreciation of tulips that would reach amazing heights in the so-called Tulip Mania that was yet to come.

Besides the tulip, the work shows the following flower species: Rosa gallica, Anemone hepatica, Aquilegia, Tagetes, Cyclamen, Lacerta agilis, Vanessa cardui, a fly, a dragonfly, and a grasshopper (on the vase).

== Other versions ==
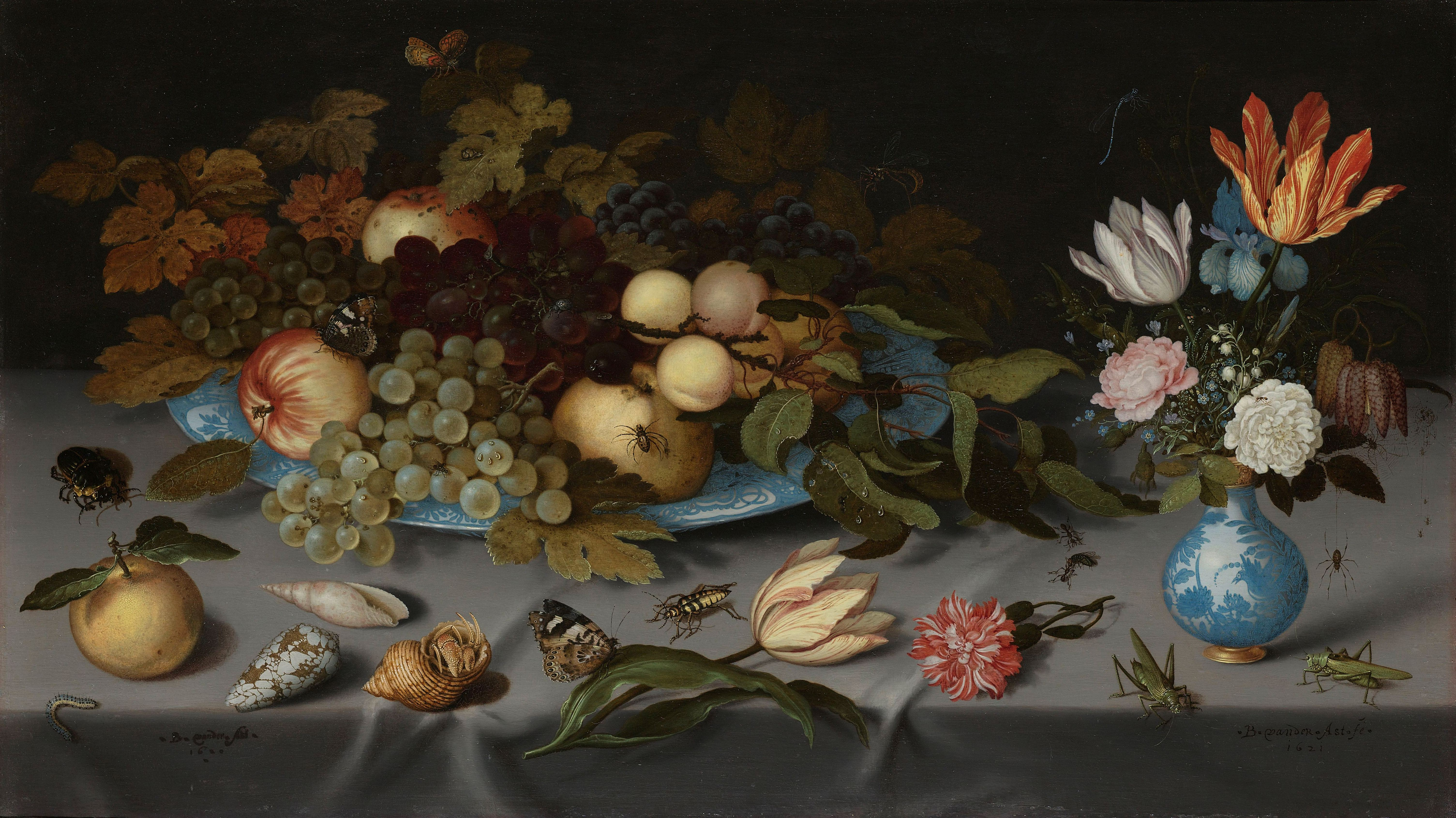
Similar vase on the right with similar crowning tulip and the grasshopper now in front of the vase

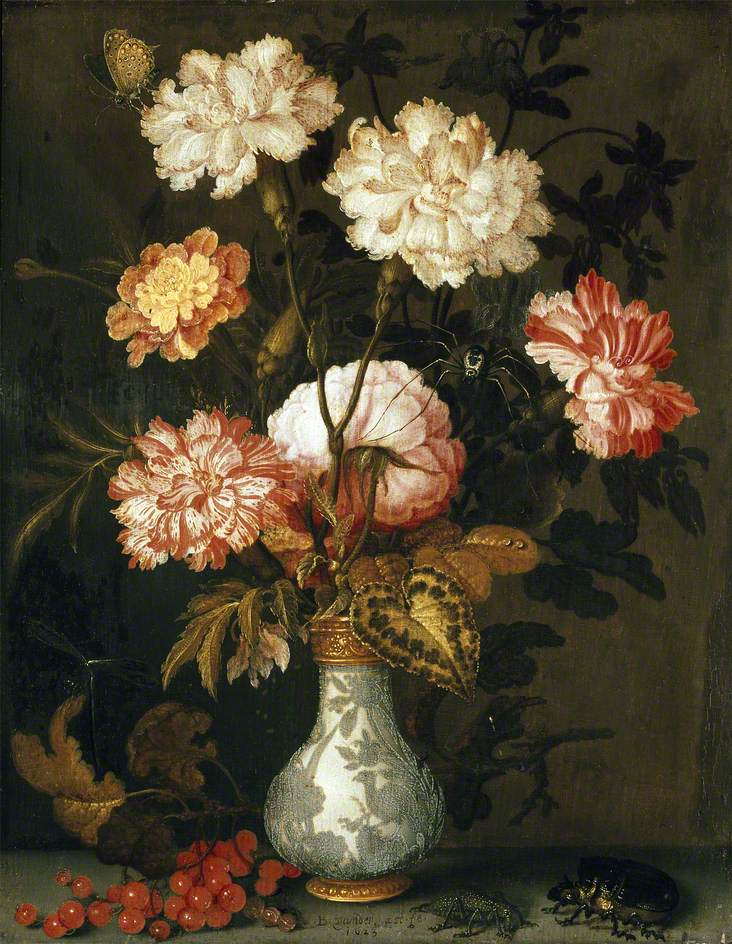
Same cyclamen leaf and carnation, with the rose seen from behind

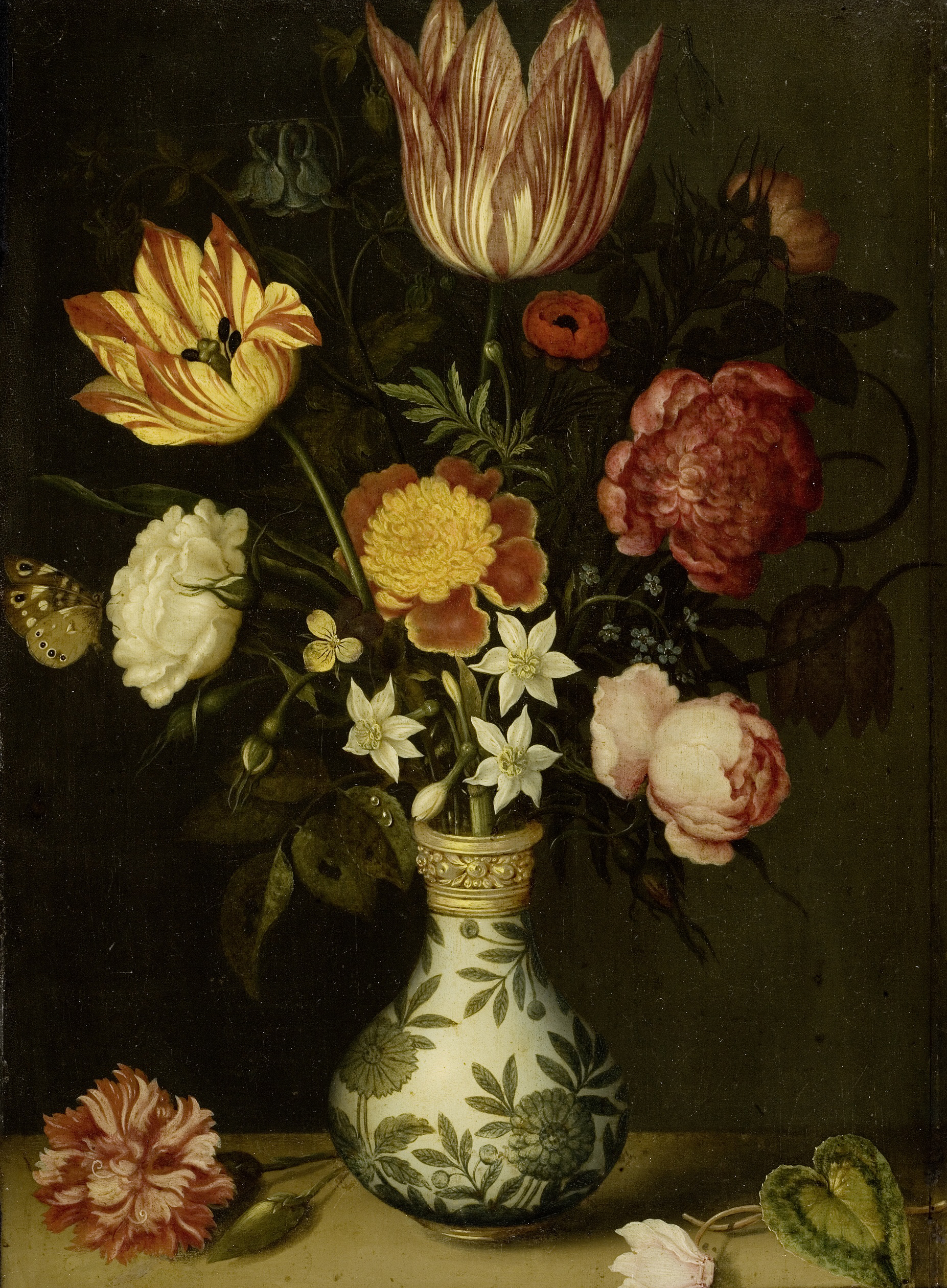
Version by his brother-in-law Ambrosius Bosschaert with the same cyclamen leaf

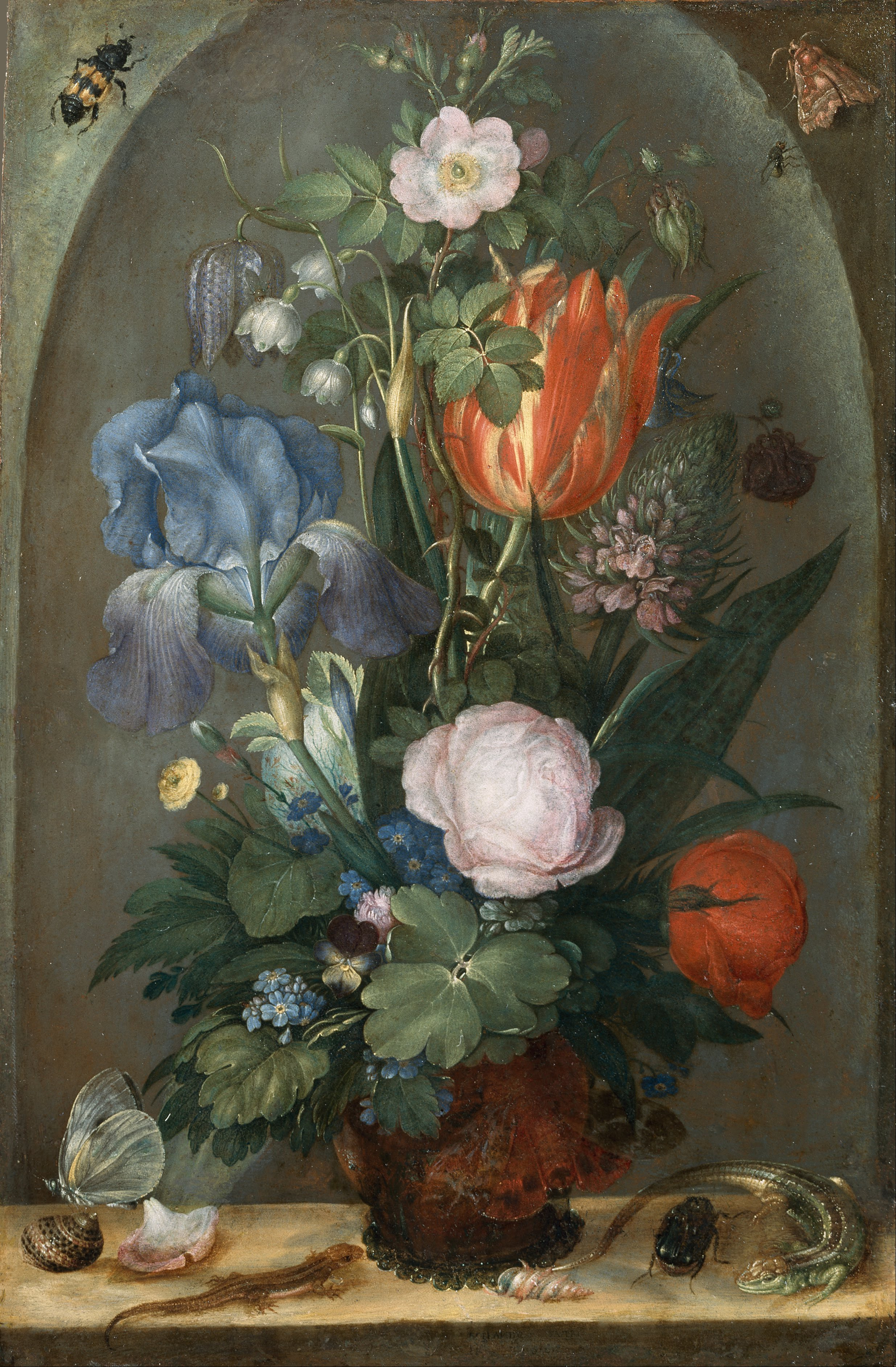
Version by Roelant Savery with the same flaming tulip and pink rose

== Later provenance ==
This painting was stored for safe-keeping during WWII in the Albrechtsburg in Meissen, from whence it was found and taken by marauding Ukrainian troops in 1945. Somehow it ended up in the possession of the German Alice Siano who later emigrated to Canada in 1951 (when she married, she became Alice Tittel) with twelve paintings, presumably eight of which were from the Meissen storage depot, and this one appeared on the art market in 1954, where it was purchased by the Dutch art collector Sidney J. van den Bergh who sold it to a New York collector in 1972. In 1991 it was part of a visiting exhibition "Great Dutch Masters from America" which referred to it as being very similar to the lost Suermondt Museum piece. It has now been purchased back and returned to the museum after 70 years. The museum had earlier recovered Flowers in a Glass Vase by Nicolaes Verendael, which had also been sold by Alice Tittel to a New York collector. About 200 paintings from the museum's collection were stolen in 1945. It is unknown how many are still missing.
