= Suermondt-Ludwig-Museum =

Art museum in Aachen, Germany

Coordinates: 50.7735°N 6.0956°E

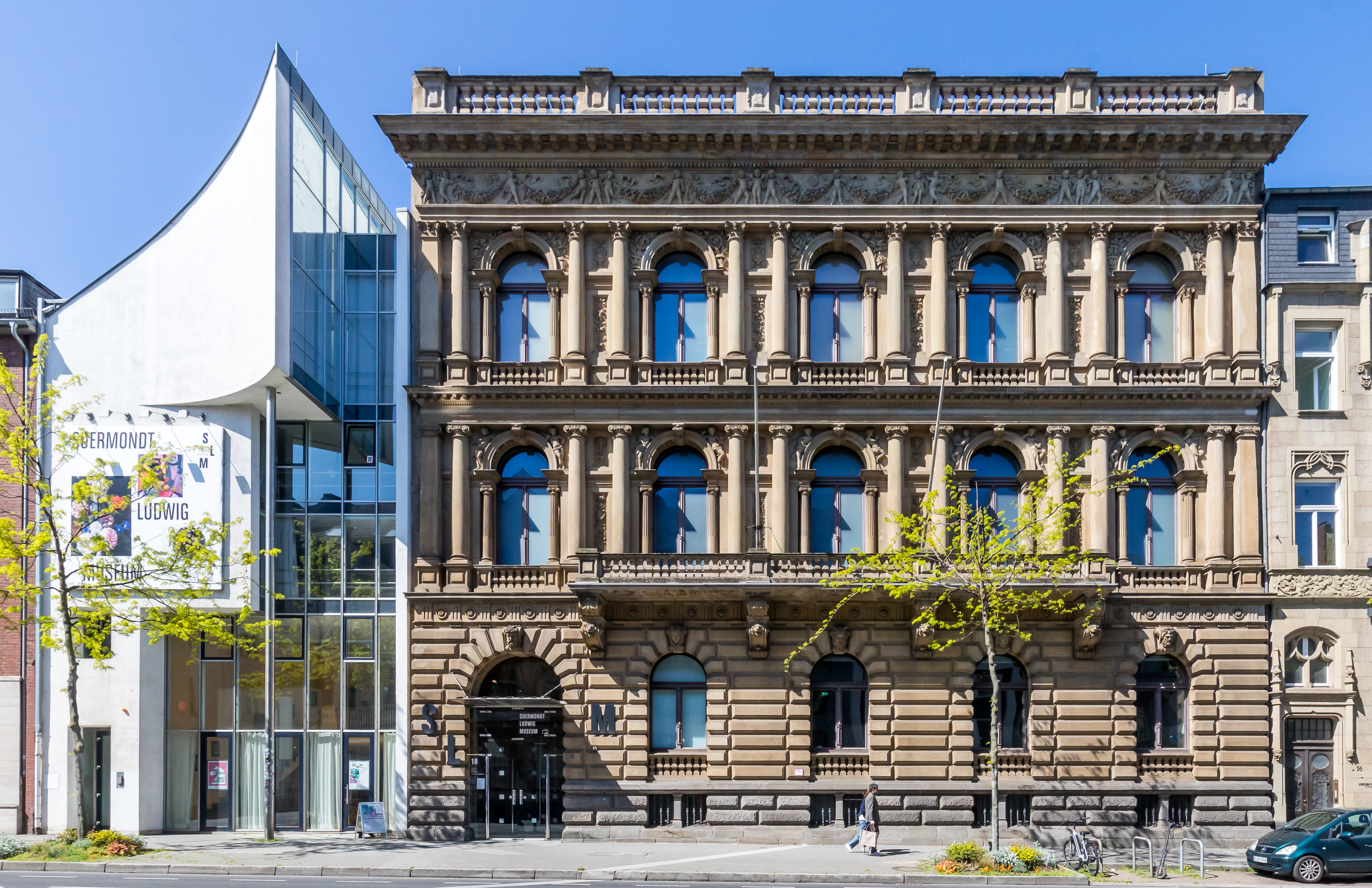
The front of the museum, with the 1994 extension on the left and the Villa Cassalette on the right

The Suermondt-Ludwig-Museum is an art museum in Aachen, Germany. Founded in 1877, its collection includes works by Aelbrecht Bouts, Joos van Cleve, Anthony van Dyck, Otto Dix and Max Beckmann.

== History ==
The Aachener Museumsverein (Aachen museum association) was created in 1877, and in 1883 a city museum was opened in the Alte Redoute (Old Redoubt) building. It was named the Suermondt Museum, after the founder Barthold Suermondt, who gave 105 paintings from his collection to the city, as well as those from the collection of his sister-in-law Adèle Cockerill. This collection, together with many other works which were later sold to Berlin, had been on display in the Suermondt Gallery in Aachen already before the museum was established.

In 1901, the museum moved to the Villa Cassalette, originally owned by the Cassalette family which had acquired fortune through the Aachener Kratzenfabrik Cassalette, which produced raising cards. Over the next decades, the building was slowly extended to house the ever growing museum collection, interrupted by WWII when the collection was stored for safe-keeping in the Albrechtsburg in Meissen. About 200 paintings were missing after the war, but the museum recently recovered two flower paintings; Flowers in a Glass Vase and Flowers in a Wan-Li Vase.

The most recent expansion was in 1992 to 1994. Major gifts were received from Anton Ignaz van Houtem and Franz Johann Joseph Bock.

In 1977, the name of the museum was changed to Suermondt-Ludwig-Museum to honour Irene and Peter Ludwig, art collectors who donated a significant part of their collection of art (medieval to modern) to the museum that year, after having given permanent loans from 1957 on.

== Building ==
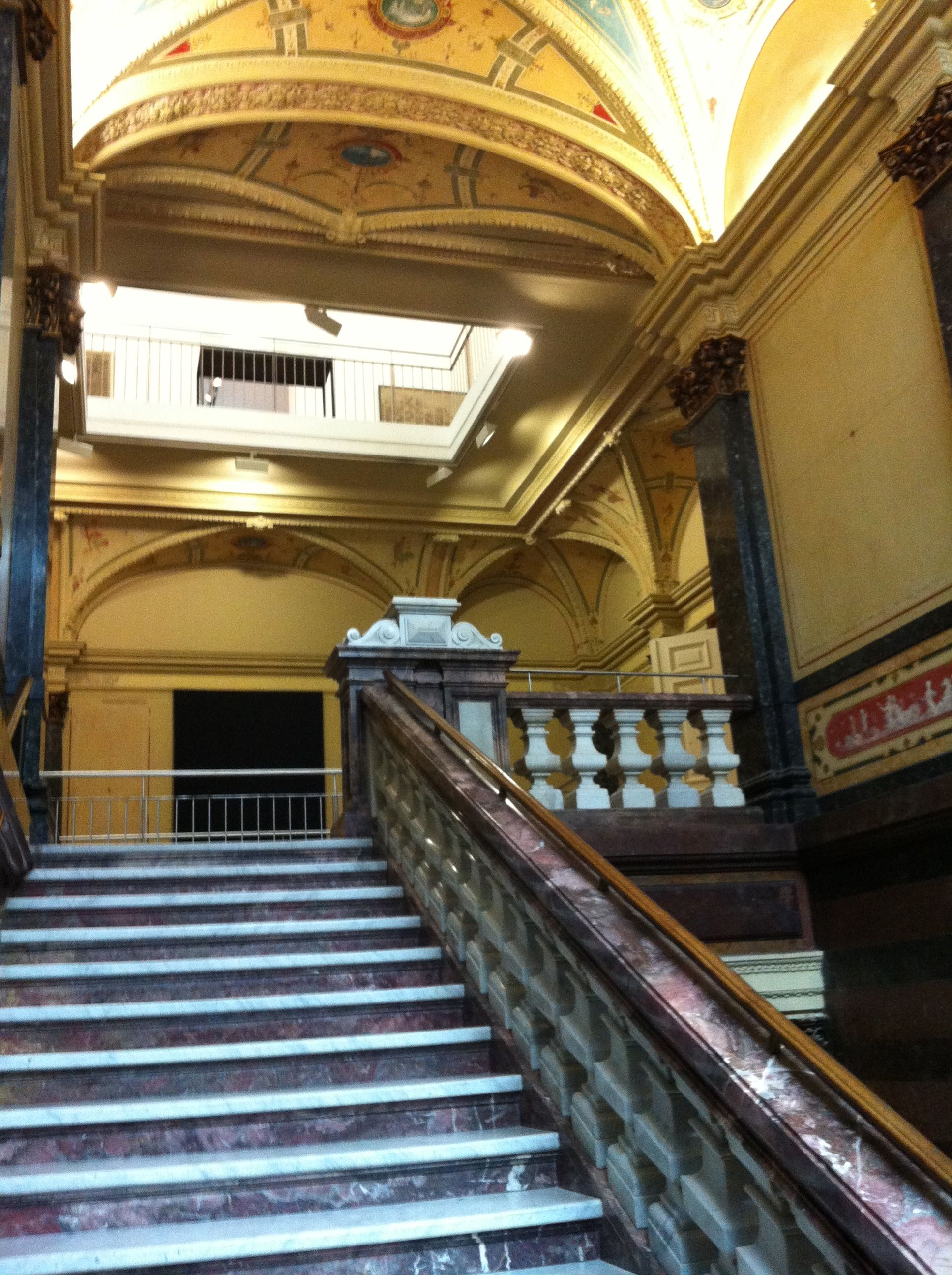
Interior view of the Villa Cassalette: the central staircase

The family Cassalette, rich factory owners in Aachen, asked the architect Eduard Linse to design a city palace in a Renaissance Revival architecture style, inspired by Venetian palaces. The interior of the Villa Cassalette was richly decorated with murals in the Pompeian style, stucco cassettes on the ceilings, and sculptures. Many small changes and extensions were made when the building became a museum in 1901 and afterwards; but much of the original interior has been restored or made visible again since. In 1992-1994, the architecture company Busmann & Haberer designed a large extension, built at the left side of the Villa.

== Collection ==
The oldest pieces in the collection are German sculptures from the 12th to 16th century. This includes works by Tilman Riemenschneider, Heinrich Douvermann and Arndt van Tricht. Amongst the earliest paintings in the collection is an Adoration of the Magi by the Master of the Glorification of the Virgin and a work by Joos van Cleve. Paintings from the 16th century include a Judith by Lucas Cranach the Elder, an Ecce Homo and Mater Dolorosa Diptych by Aelbrecht Bouts and a Mary Magdalen by Cornelis Engebrechtsz. Major artists from the 17th century who are represented here include from Spain Francisco de Zurbarán, Luis de Morales and Jusepe de Ribera and from Italy Bartolomeo Manfredi. The large collection of paintings from Flanders and the Netherlands shows works by Anthony van Dyck, Jacob Jordaens, Frans Snyders, Jacob Isaacksz van Ruisdael, Frans Hals, Willem Claeszoon Heda, Willem Kalf, Joseph de Bray and Jan Boeckhorst.

The modern art collection is largely restricted to artists living or working in Germany, including internationally known ones like Alexej von Jawlensky, Otto Dix, Max Beckmann, August Macke and Andreas Achenbach.

Other disciplines on display include a large collection of glass painting, 10,000 works of graphic art by artists like Albrecht Dürer, Rembrandt and many others, Flemish tapestries, and works of goldsmiths.

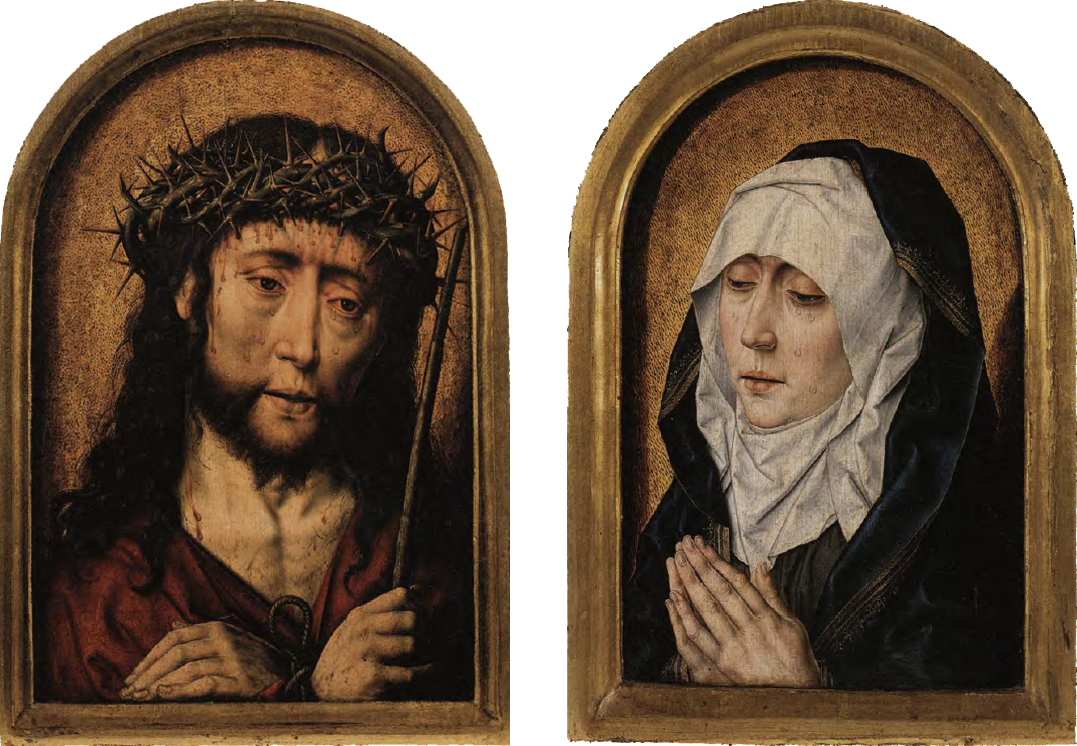
Ecce Homo and Mater Dolorosa Diptych, by Aelbrecht Bouts. c. 1491–1520

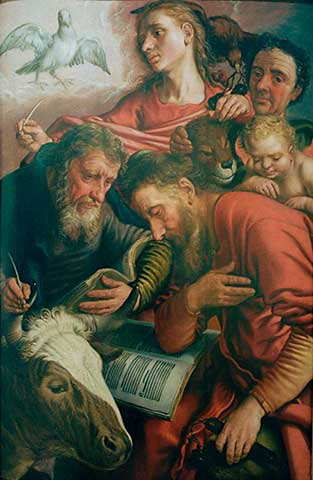
The Four Evangelists by Pieter Aertsen

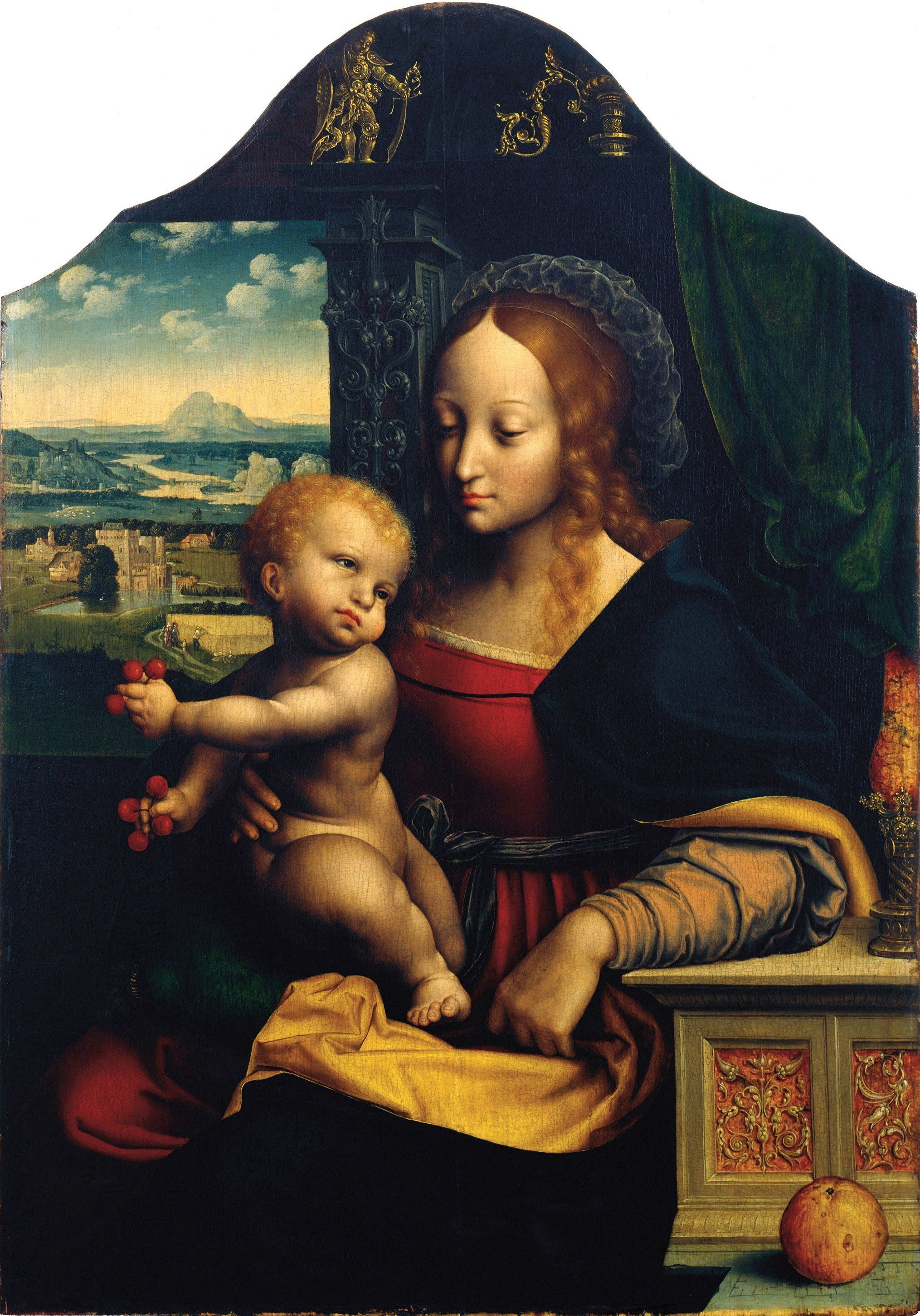
The Cherry Madonna by Joos van Cleve

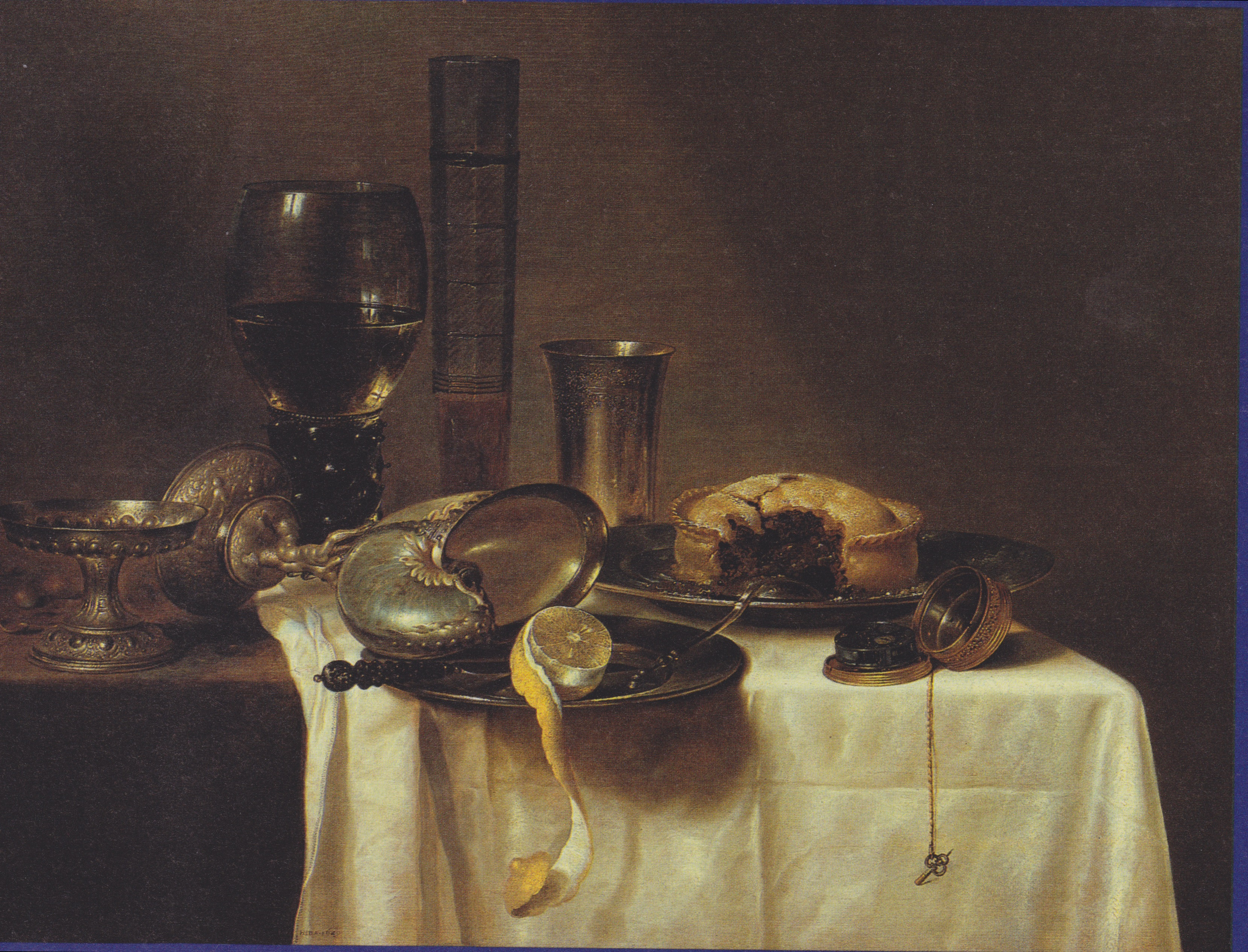
Still life with nautilus cup by Willem Claeszoon Heda
