= Flowers in a Glass Vase =

Painting by Nicolaes van Verendael

Flowers in a glass vase on a partly draped stone ledge
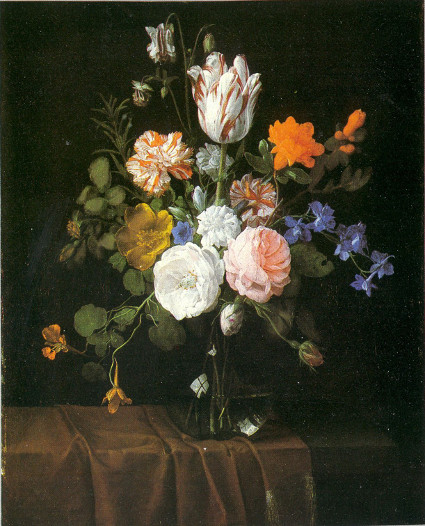
- Artist: Nicolaes van Verendael
- Year: 1660s
- Medium: oil paint, canvas
- Dimensions: 49.5 cm (19.5 in) × 39.5 cm (15.6 in)
- Location: Suermondt-Ludwig-Museum
- Accession: GK 535

Flowers in a glass vase on a partly draped stone ledge is a circa 1667 floral painting by Nicolaes van Verendael in the collection of the Suermondt-Ludwig-Museum.

== Early history and creation ==
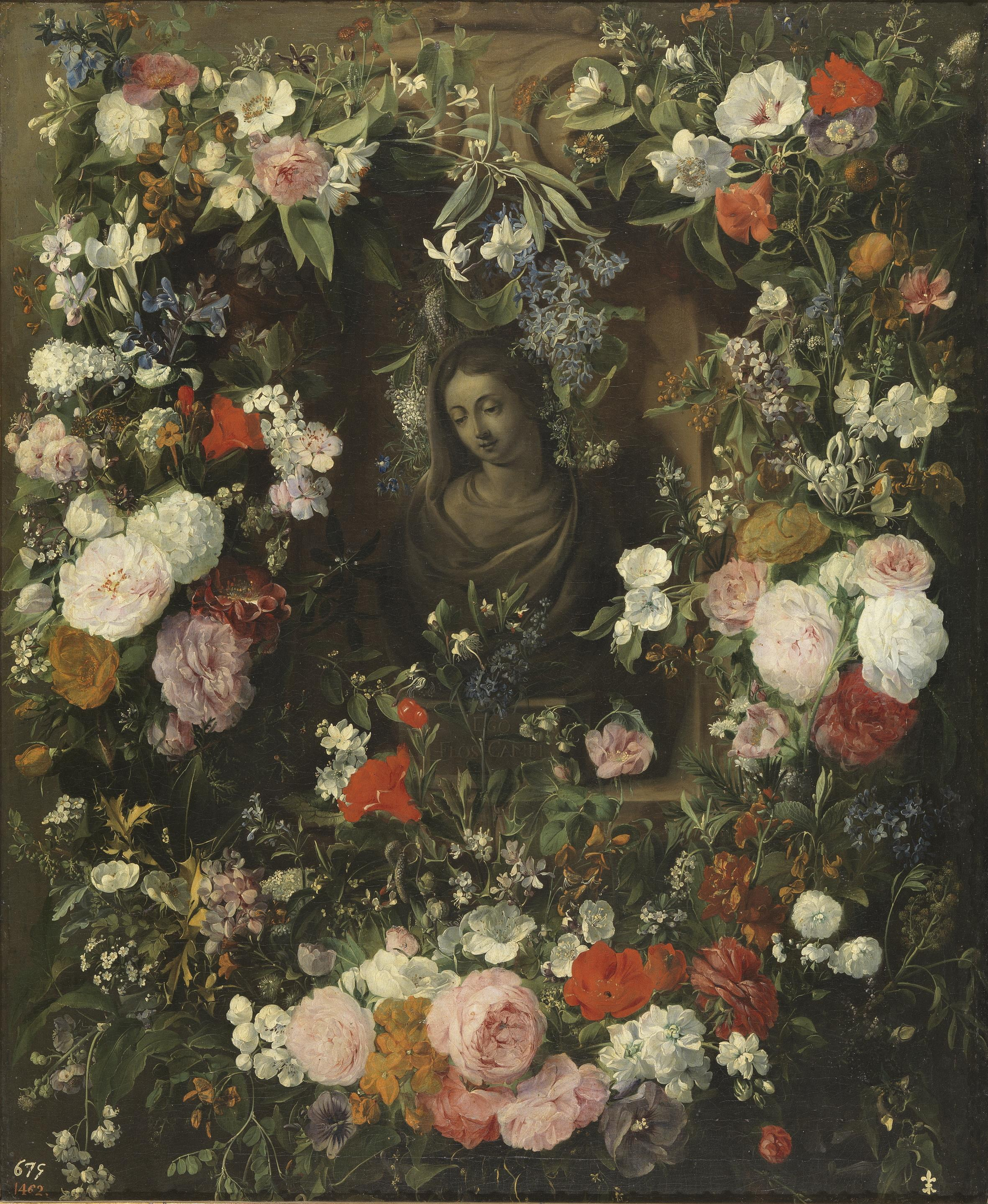
Garland painting in the Prado

Nicolaes van Verendael was a respected flower painter in Antwerp who worked with Jan Davidsz. de Heem, among others. The early provenance of this painting is unknown but it can be dated based on other works by Van Verendael, such as his garland painting in the Prado which was long attributed to Jan Brueghel the Elder, who began floral painting in Antwerp a half-century beforehand.

== Description and interpretation ==
This painting dates to the period in Antwerp when hothouses became popular among the nobility and patrons ordered paintings to record their personal hothouse triumphs. Not all of the blooms would have bloomed at the same time, and the painting was meant more for decoration than for botanical accuracy. The work shows the following flower species: Rosa alba, Tropaeolum majus, Hepatica nobilis, rosemary, Tulipa, Delphinium, Aquilegia, Punica granatum, Rosa × centifolia.

== Later history and influence ==
This painting was stored for safe-keeping during WWII in the Albrechtsburg in Meissen, from whence it was found and taken by marauding Soviet troops in 1945. Somehow it ended up in the possession of a German citizen who later migrated to Canada and it appeared on the art market in the 1970s, whereupon it was returned to the museum after 70 years.
