= Ecce Homo and Mater Dolorosa Diptych =

Diptych by Aelbert Bout (painting)

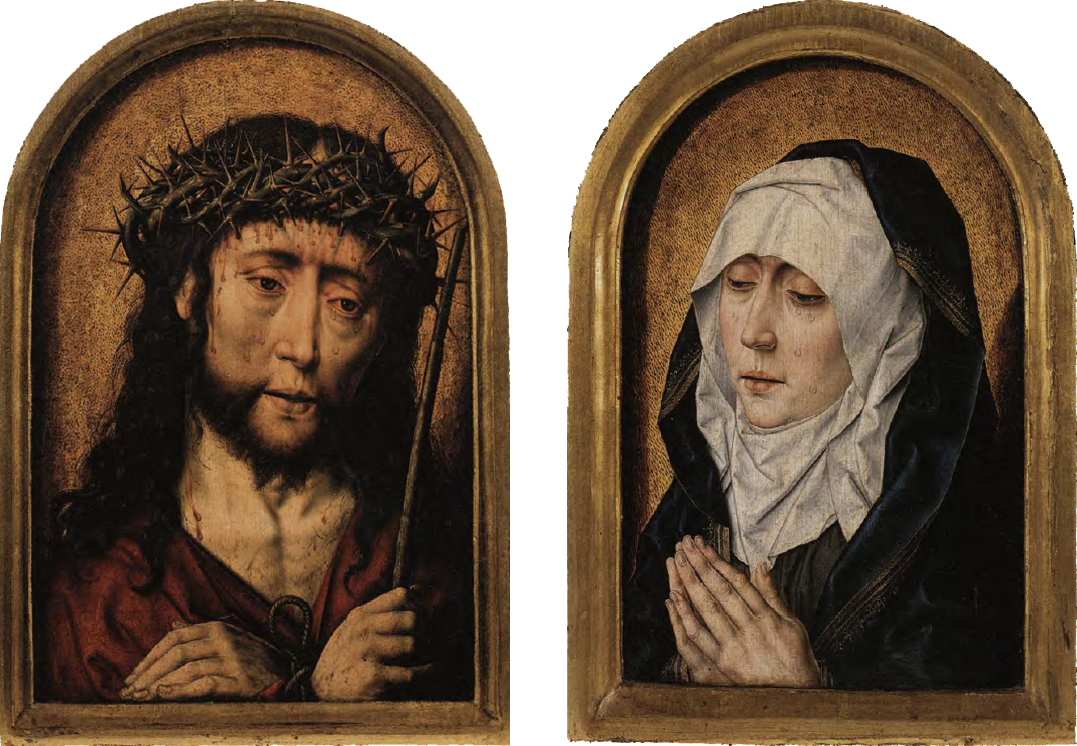
Ecce Homo and Mater Dolorosa Diptych. Each panel 45.5 x 31 cm. Suermondt-Ludwig-Museum, Aachen, Germany

The Ecce Homo and Mater Dolorosa Diptych consisted of two small oil-on-panel paintings usually attributed to the Early Netherlandish artist Aelbrecht Bouts produced between 1491 – 1520. For many years they formed the wings of a hinged devotional diptych, but are now broken apart. Although their exact dating is unknown, the Ecce Homo (Behold the Man) panel, portraying Jesus bound and crowned with thorns, is thought to have been painted after 1491, while the Mater Dolorosa panel presents the Virgin Mary as Our Lady of Sorrows, and was painted after 1517. Both panels measure 45.5 x 31 cm, although the Mater Dolorosa is slightly larger at 31.1 cm wide. They are in the collection of the Suermondt-Ludwig-Museum, Aachen, Germany, where they are hung alongside each other.

The panels portray Jesus and Virgin Mary in the moments before his Crucifixion, and are infused with senses of physical and mental suffering. Jesus is scourged, and captured at the moment shortly before his Crucifixion when he is brought before the hostile crowd to be judged. By tradition, this moment was just before Veronica offers him a towel to wipe his face, which leaves an imprint and becomes known as the Veil of Veronica. Jesus is pierced with thorns as blood streams across his face. That the panel is tightly cropped brings the viewer closer to his suffering. According to art historian Elliott D. Wise, "by fracturing the Ecce Homo narrative into a dramatically cropped view of Christ’s head, Bouts evokes the disembodied Holy Face that would soon be impressed on the cloth of the sudarium, and that is already replicated with equal authenticity on the heart of the Lord’s co-suffering mother in the right pane".

The Virgin is identifiable as the Mater Dolorosa by the tears that stream down her face.

Bouts painted many versions of the Ecce Homo during his career. His father, Dieric, had painted a similar set of oil-on-oak panels c. 1470–75, known as the Christ and the Virgin Diptych, now in the National Gallery, London. Of the many versions completed by Albrecht and his workshop, the current diptych is widely considered the most successful.

== Sources ==
- Dresser, Louisa (ed). Catalogue of European Paintings in the Worcester Art Museum. University of Massachusetts Press, 1974. ISBN 978-0-8702-3169-8
- Wise, Elliott. "Cycles of Memory and Circular Compassion in a Germanic Passion Diptych". Journal of Historians of Netherlandish Art, 2018. DOI: 10.5092
