= Dieric Bouts the Younger =

Flemish painter

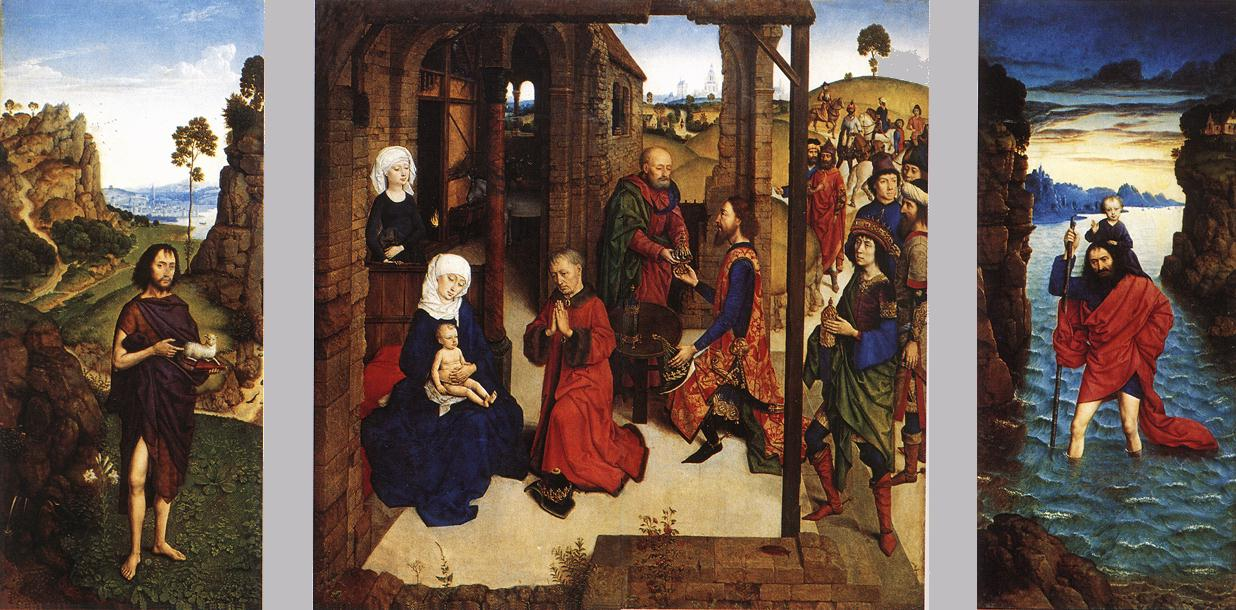
The Pearl of Brabant; left, St. John the Baptist, center, Adoration of the Magi, right; St. Christopher

Dieric Bouts the Younger, also Dirk Bouts the Younger, (1448 – May 2, 1491) was a Flemish painter who was mainly active in Leuven. He is known for his altarpieces painted in the Early Netherlandish painting style.

== Life ==
Dieric was born into a family of painters in Leuven. He was trained by his father the painter Dieric Bouts the Elder (ca.1415-1475), and his brother was Aelbrecht Bouts (1450s-1549). His son Jan Bouts (1478-1531) also became a painter. Dieric inherited his father’s shop in 1475, while his brother Aelbrecht established his own workshop, also in Leuven. Dieric the Younger was listed in the city archives of Leuven as 'pictor ymaginum' from 1483 to 1490.

In 1486 he was commissioned to work with his brother on the wings of the triptych of the Holy Sacrament in St. Peter's Church, Leuven. Bouts died at a young age on May 2, 1491. His brother Albert became guardian of his minor son Jan who was also active as a painter in Mechelen.

== Work ==
Because his painting style was almost indistinguishable from that of his father, it is difficult to attribute paintings. There are art historians who attribute the work The Pearl of Brabant, a wing altar display in the Alte Pinakothek in Munich directly to the Younger. However, other art historians attribute it to his father because of the high quality of work.

Whereas Dieric the Younger continued in his father's style, Aelbrecht developed his own unmistakable style with strong colors, rich texture and fine details.

== Sources ==
- Friedländer, Max J. Early Netherlandish Painting. Translated by Heinz Norden. Leiden: Praeger, 1967-76 ASIN B0006BQGOW
- F. BAUDOUIN, Dieric Bouts II, in the National Biographical Dictionary, Part 1, col. 261-262, Brussels 1964
- A. WAUTERS, Thierri Bouts le jeune, in the Biographie Nationale, part 2, col. 883-884, Brussels, 1868
