= Aelbrecht Bouts =

Flemish painter (c.1452-1549)

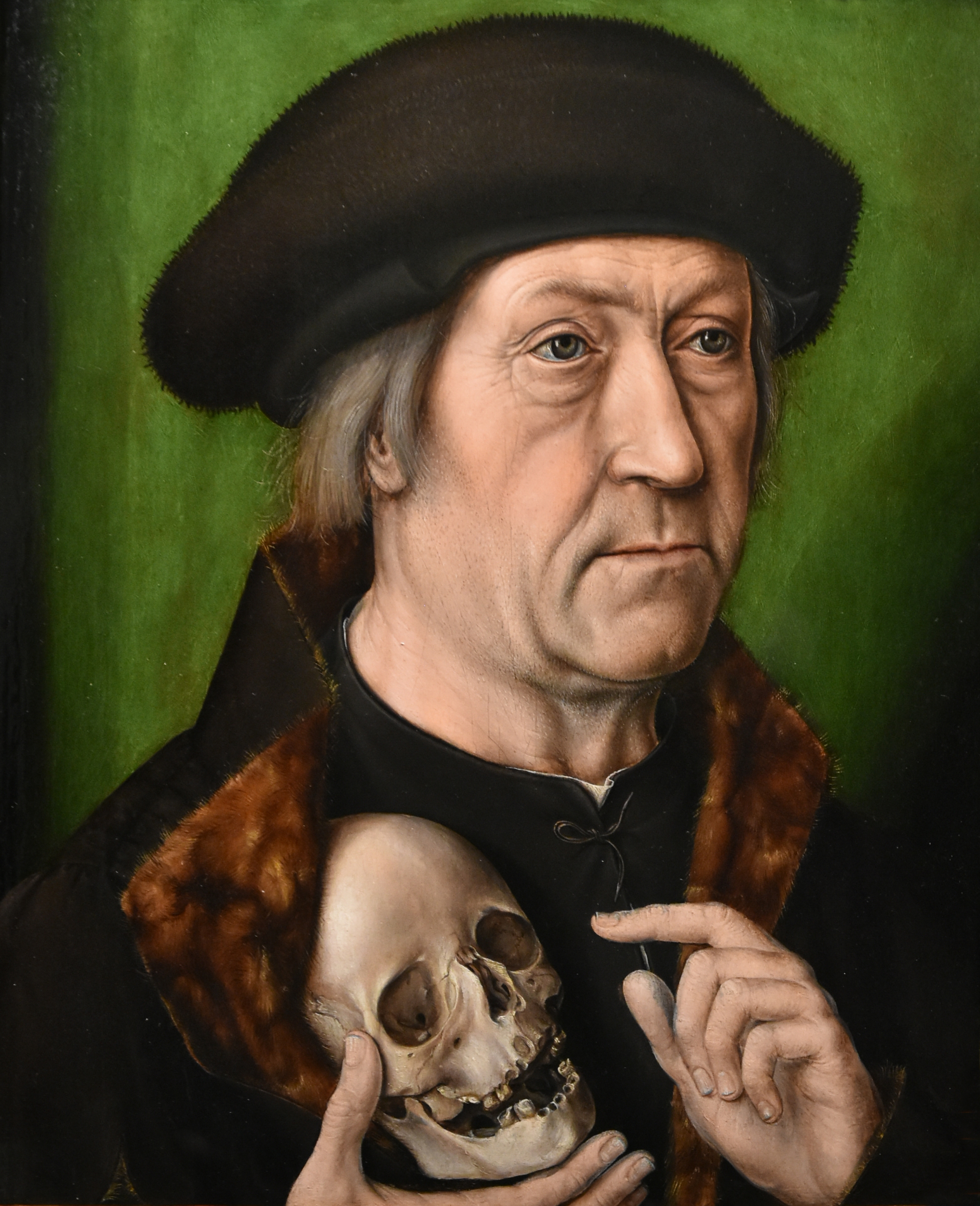
Selfportrait with skull by Bouts, Noordbrabants Museum

Aelbrecht Bouts (c.1452 - March 1549) was a Flemish painter of the Early Netherlandish era. His first name is sometimes spelled ‘Albert’, ‘Aelbert’ or ‘Albrecht’. He was born into a family of painters in Leuven. Aelbrecht’s father was Dieric Bouts the Elder (c. 1415-1475), and his brother was Dieric Bouts the Younger (c. 1448-1490). Jan Bouts (c. 1478-c. 1530), son of Dieric Bouts the Younger, also became a painter. Dieric Bouts the Younger inherited his father’s shop in 1475, while Aelbrecht established his own workshop, also in Leuven. Whereas Dieric the Younger continued in his father's style, Aelbrecht developed his own unmistakable style with strong colors, rich texture and fine details. He died in Leuven.

Bob Jones University Museum & Gallery (Greenville, South Carolina), the McNay Art Museum (San Antonio, Texas), the Cleveland Museum of Art, the Fitzwilliam Museum (Cambridge), Harvard University Art Museums, the Honolulu Museum of Art, the Hood Museum of Art (Hanover, New Hampshire), the Norton Simon Museum (Pasadena, California), the Nelson-Atkins Museum of Art (Kansas City, Missouri), the Royal Museums of Fine Arts of Belgium, the Czartoryski Museum and the Staatsgalerie Stuttgart are among the public collections having paintings by Aelbrecht Bouts.

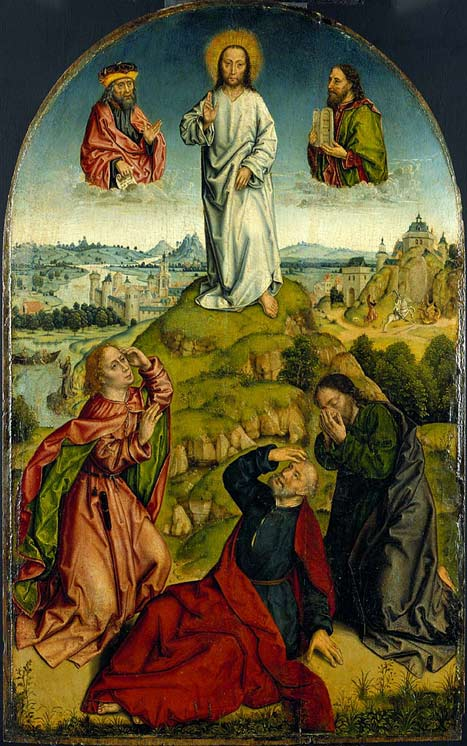
The Transfiguration, Fitzwilliam Museum

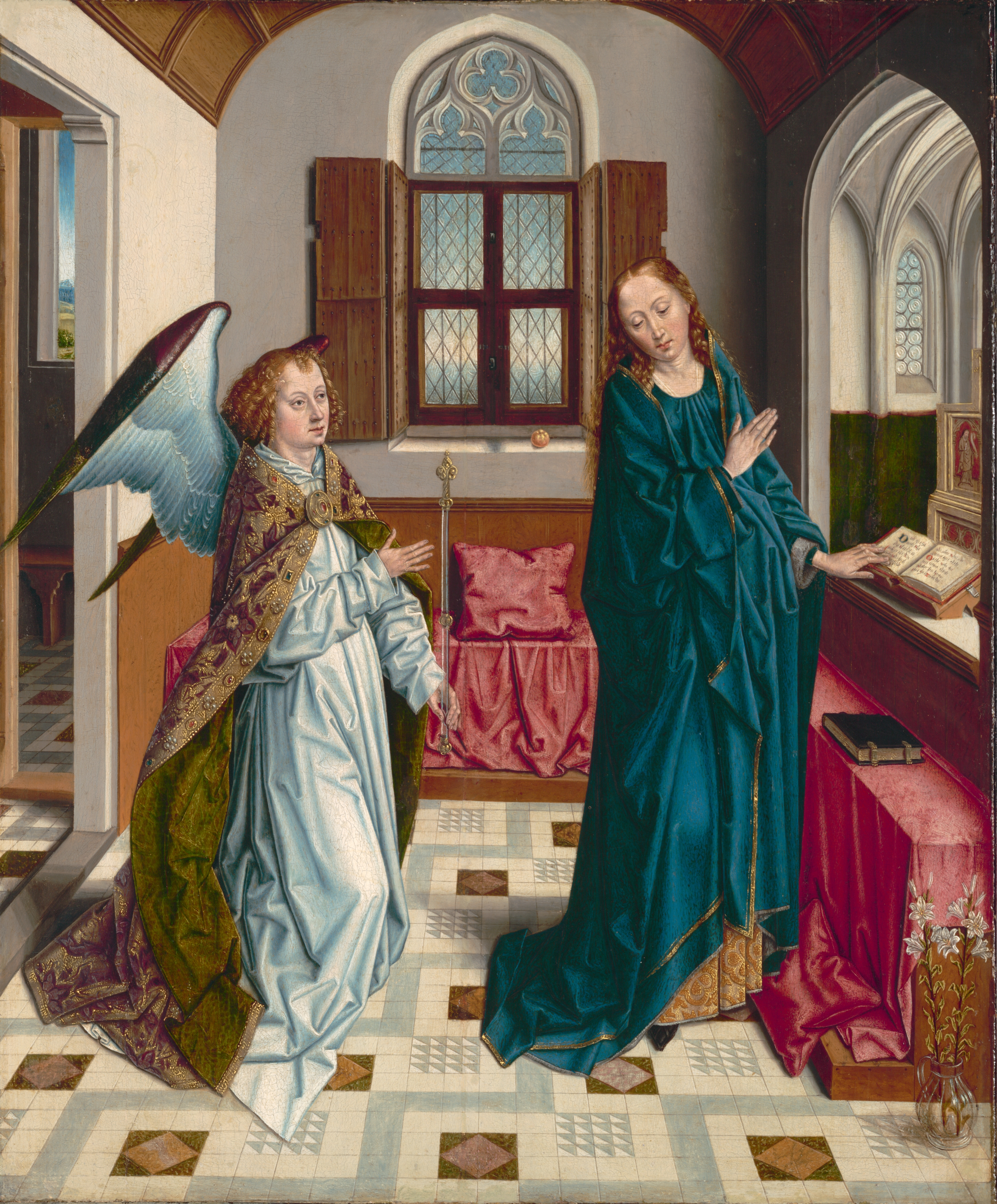
The Annunciation, Cleveland Museum of Art

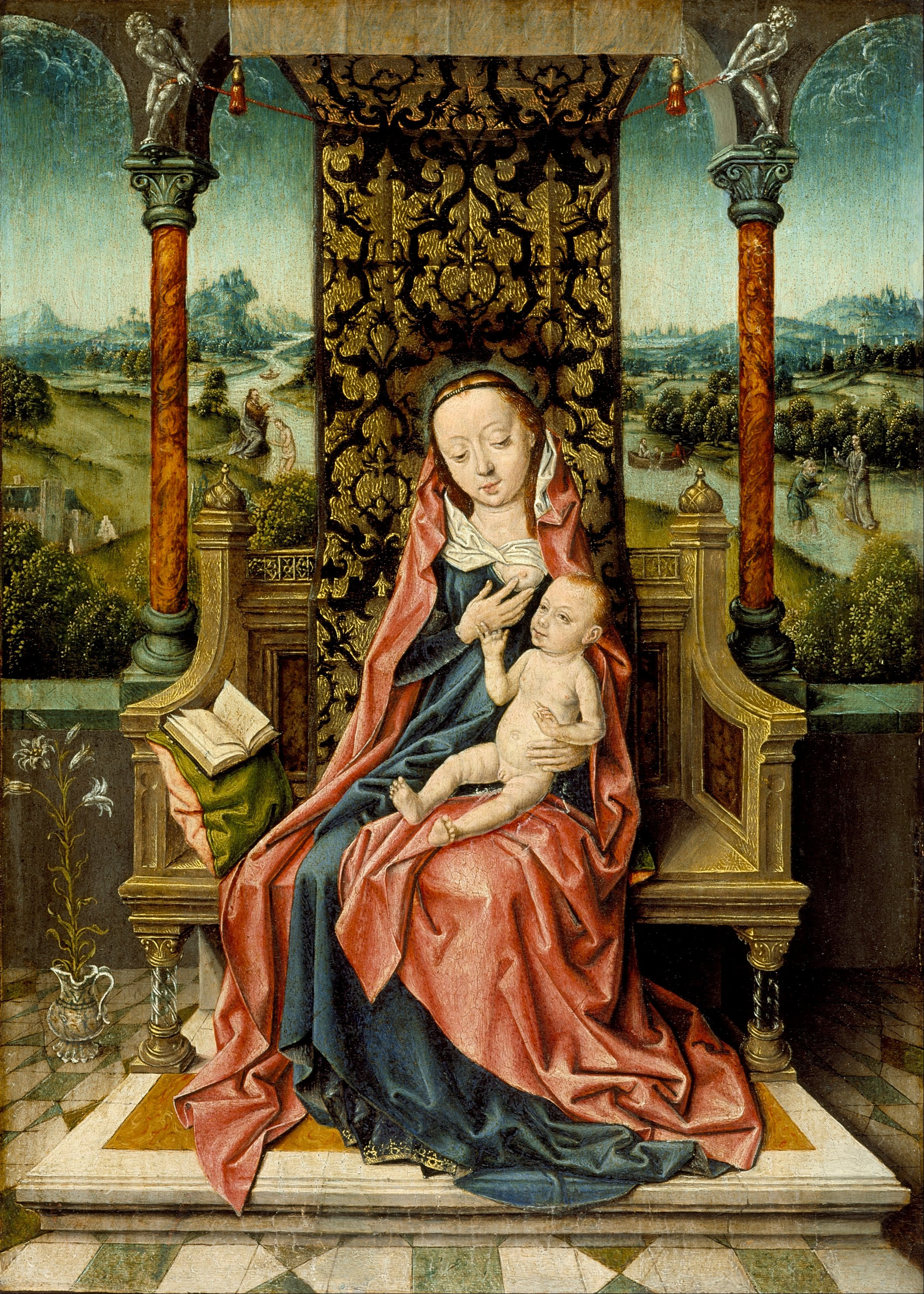
Madonna and Child Enthroned (c. 1510), Los Angeles County Museum of Art

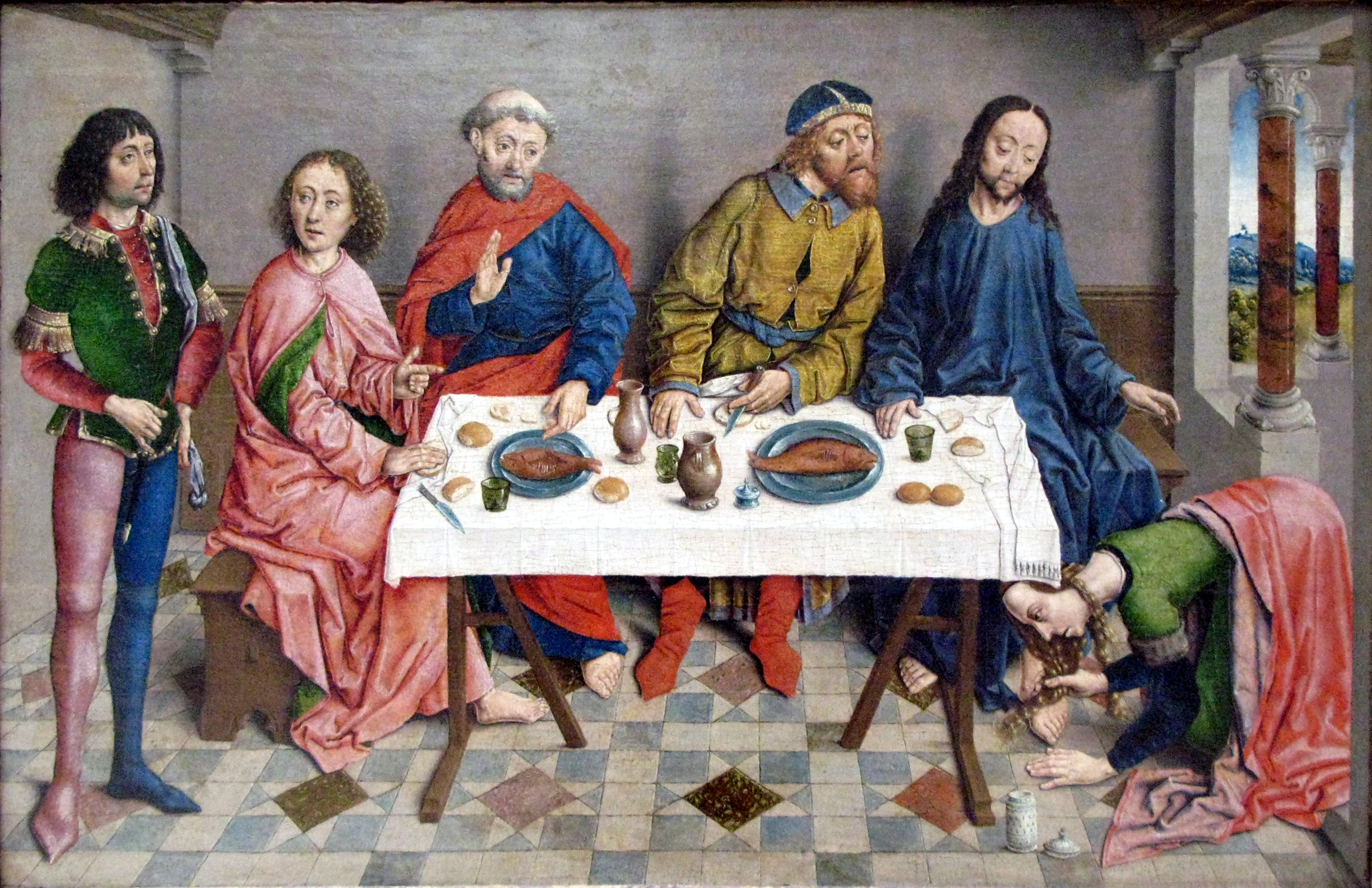
Jesus with Simon the Pharisee, Royal Museums of Fine Arts of Belgium

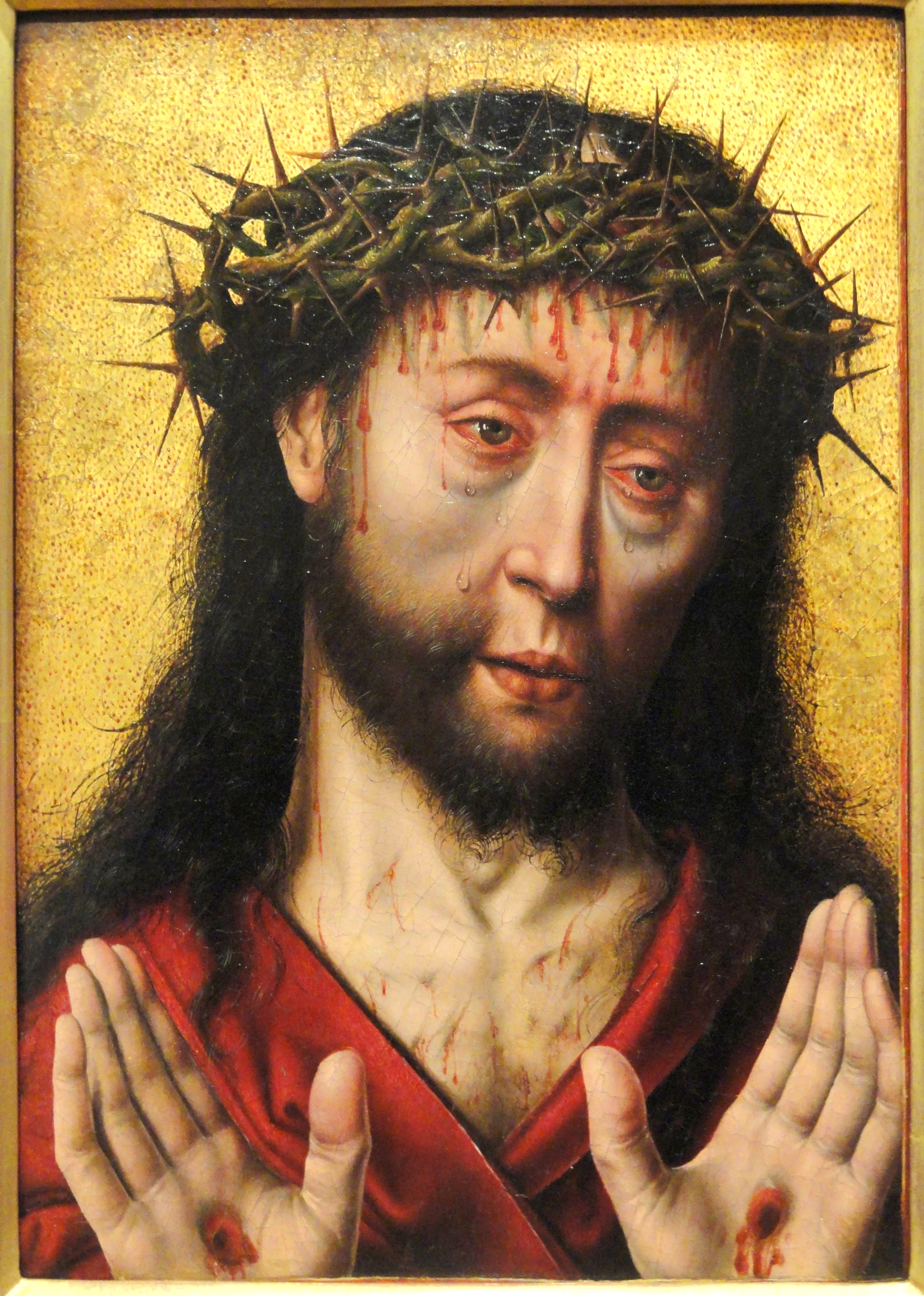
Man of Sorrow (c.1495), Fogg Art Museum

The Adoration of the Shepherds. Royal Museum of Fine Arts Antwerp. c. between 1490 and 1499

== See also ==
- Ecce Homo and Mater Dolorosa Diptych
