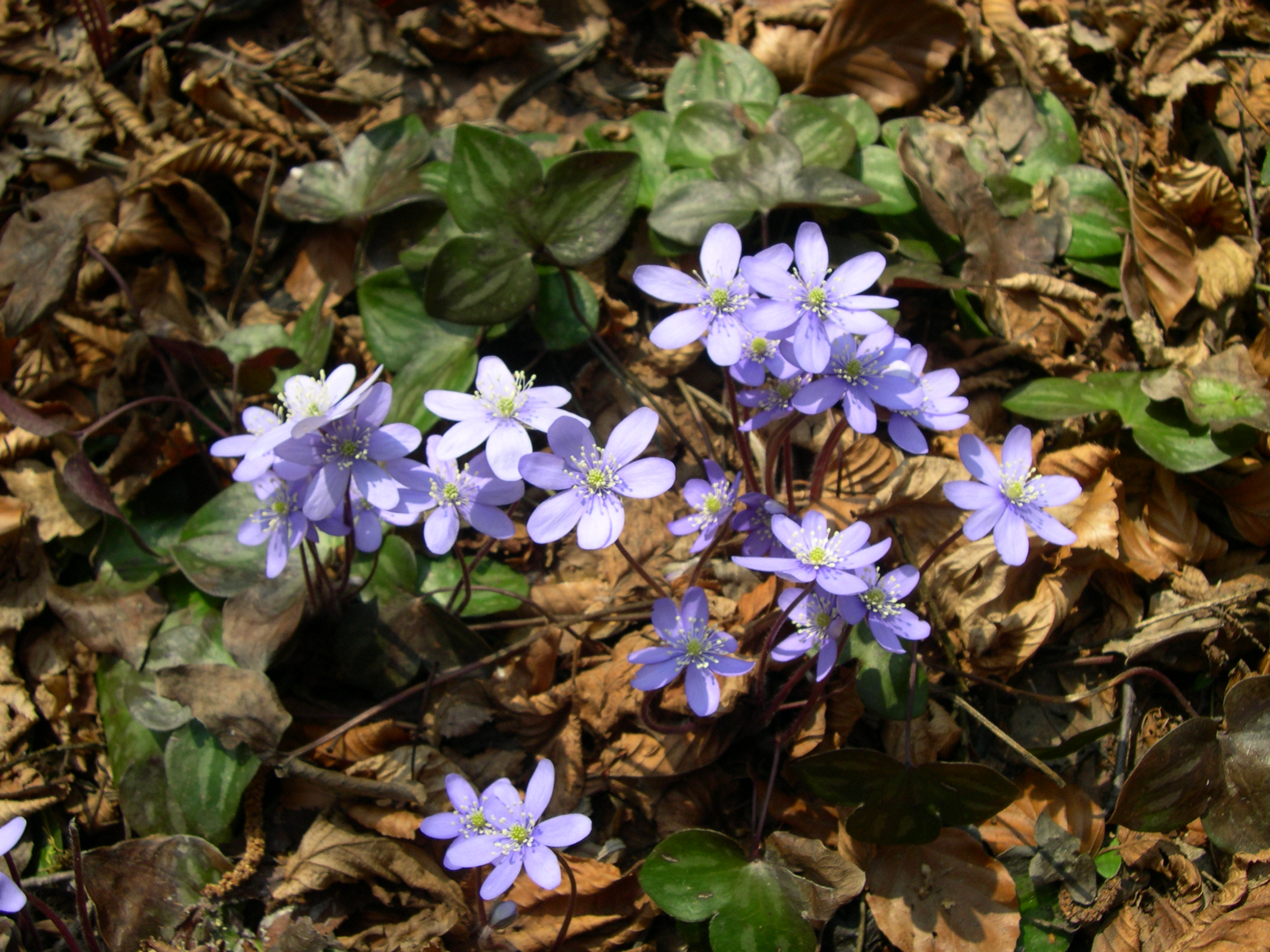

Scientific classification
- Kingdom: Plantae
- Clade: Tracheophytes
- Clade: Angiosperms
- Clade: Eudicots
- Order: Ranunculales
- Family: Ranunculaceae
- Genus: Anemone
- Species: A. hepatica

Binomial name
- Anemone hepatica L.

Synonyms
- List: Anemone acuta (Pursh) Vail ex Britton; Anemone acutiloba (DC.) G.Lawson; Anemone praecox Salisb.; Anemone transylvanica Heuff.; Anemone triloba Stokes; Hepatica acuta (Pursh) Britton; Hepatica acutiloba DC.; Hepatica anemonoides Vest; Hepatica asiatica Nakai; Hepatica hepatica (L.) H.Karst. nom. inval.; Hepatica hepatica var. albiflora (R.Hoffm.) Farw.; Hepatica insularis Nakai; Hepatica nobilis Schreb. non Mill.; Hepatica nobilis f. acutiloba (DC.) Beck; Hepatica nobilis f. albiflora (R.Hoffm.) Steyerm.; Hepatica nobilis f. hypopurpurea (Makino) Nakai; Hepatica nobilis f. lutea Kadota; Hepatica nobilis f. plena (Fernald) Steyerm.; Hepatica nobilis f. pubescens (M.Hiroe) Kadota; Hepatica nobilis f. rosea (R.Hoffm.) Steyerm.; Hepatica nobilis f. variegata (Makino) Nakai; Hepatica nobilis var. acuta (Pursh) Steyerm.; Hepatica nobilis var. asiatica (Nakai) H.Hara; Hepatica nobilis var. japonica Nakai; Hepatica nobilis var. nipponica Nakai; Hepatica triloba Choix

= Anemone hepatica =

Species of flowering plant

Anemone hepatica (syn. Hepatica nobilis), the common hepatica, liverwort, liverleaf, kidneywort, or pennywort, is a species of flowering plant in the buttercup family Ranunculaceae, native to woodland in temperate regions of the Northern Hemisphere. This herbaceous perennial grows from a rhizome.

== Description ==
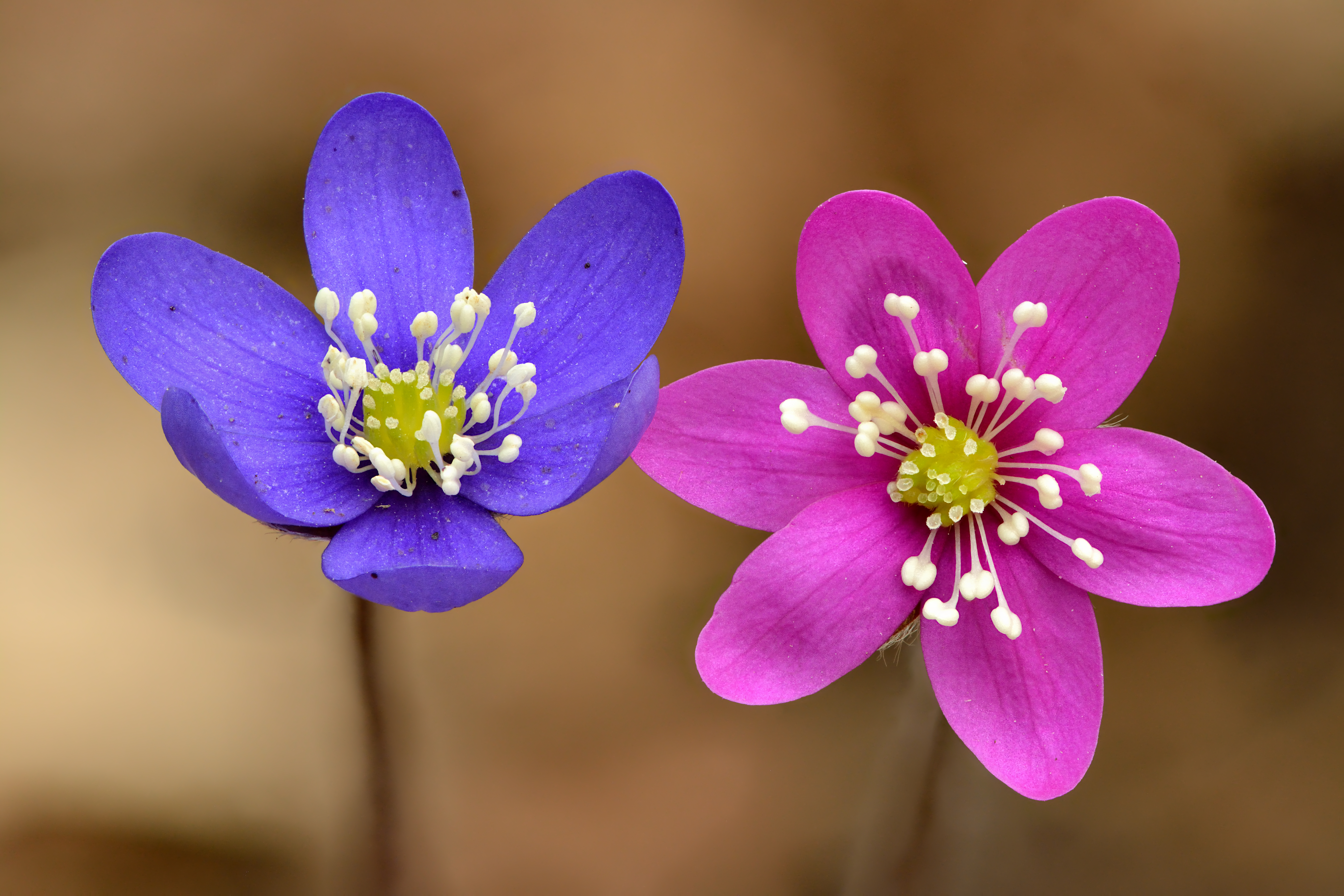
Blue and pink Anemone hepatica flowers

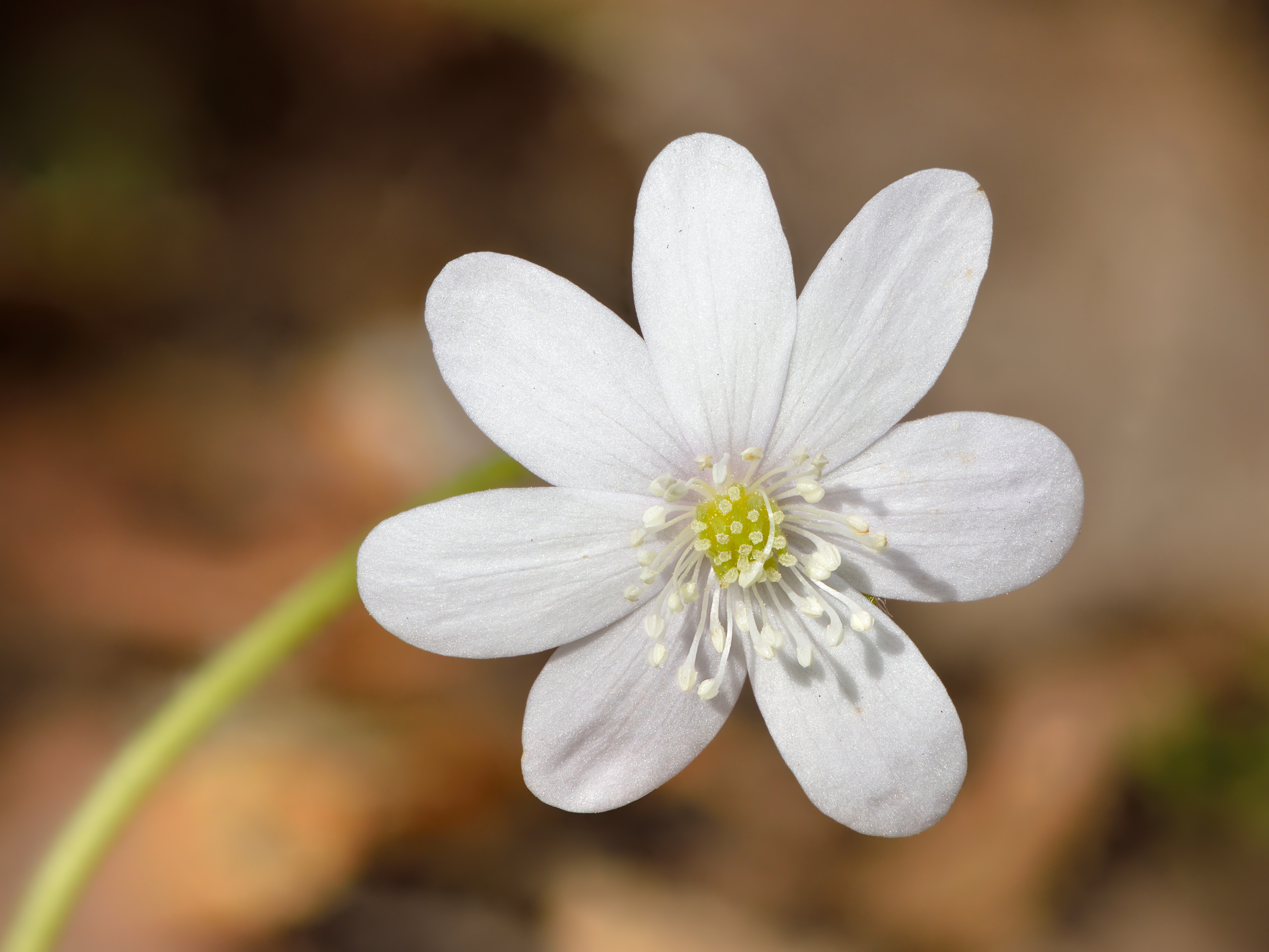
White flowered common hepatica

Anemone hepatica grows 5–15 cm (2–6 in) high. Leaves and flowers emerge directly from the rhizome, not from a stem above ground.

The leaves have three lobes and are fleshy and hairless, 7–9 cm (2 3/4–3 1/2 in) wide and 5–6 cm (2–2 1/4 in) long. The upper side is dark green with whitish stripes and the lower side is violet or reddish brown. Leaves emerge during or after flowering and remain green through winter.

The flowers are blue, purple, pink, or white and appear in winter or spring. They have five to ten oval showy sepals and three green bracts.

== Taxonomy ==
The taxonomy of the genus Anemone and its species is not fully resolved, but phylogenetic studies of many species of Anemone and related genera indicate that species of the genus Hepatica should be included under Anemone because of similarities both in molecular attributes and other shared morphologies. The circumscription of the taxon is also debated, some authors listing the North American var. acuta and var. obtusa, while other list them as the separate species A. acutiloba and A. americana, respectively.

=== Varieties ===
Varieties of Anemone hepatica that are sometimes recognized include:

- Anemone hepatica var. japonica, a synonym of Hepatica nobilis var. japonica Nakai, is native to the Russian Far East, China, Korea, and Japan
- Anemone hepatica var. acuta, a synonym of Hepatica acutiloba DC., is native to eastern North America
- Anemone hepatica var. obtusa, a synonym of Hepatica americana (DC.) Ker Gawl., is native to eastern North America
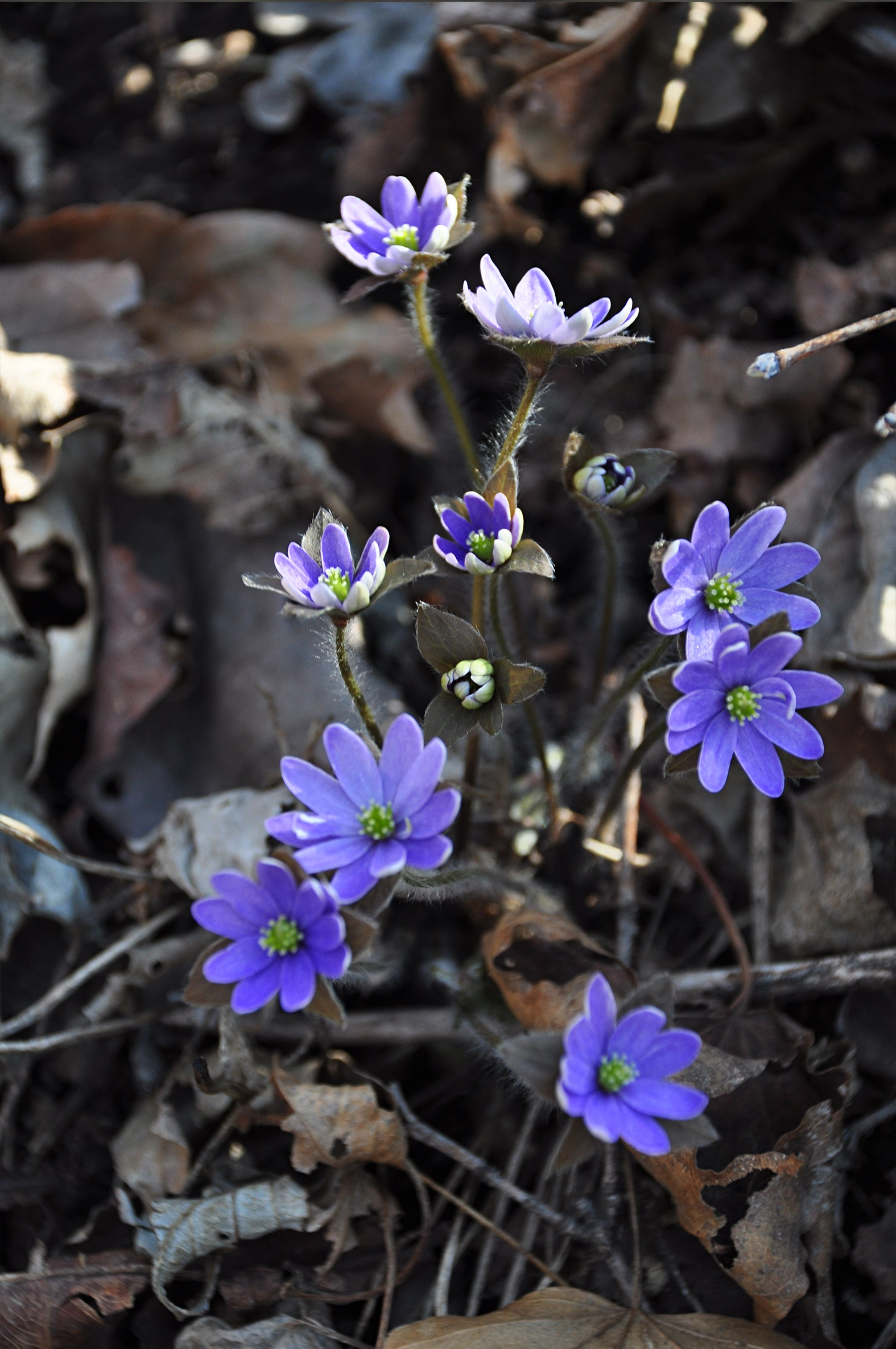
Anemone hepatica var. japonica

== Distribution and habitat ==
It is found in woods, thickets and meadows, especially in the mountains of continental Europe, North America and Japan.

== Ecology ==
Hepatica flowers produce pollen but no nectar. In North America, the flowers first attract Lasioglossum sweat bees and small carpenter bees looking in vain for nectar. Then when the stamens begin to release pollen, the bees return to collect and feed on pollen. Mining bees sometimes visit the flowers, but prefer flowers that produce both nectar and pollen.

== Toxicity ==
Like other Ranunculaceae, fresh liverwort contains protoanemonin and is therefore slightly toxic.

== Uses ==
Under the name Hepatica nobilis, which is regarded as a synonym, this plant has gained the Royal Horticultural Society's Award of Garden Merit.

== Culture ==
It is since 2006 the official flower of the Sweden Democrats political party in Swedish politics.

In Japan, where the plant is known as Yukiwariso (雪割草, yukiwarisō, lit. 'snow-breaking plant') or Misumisō (ミスミソウ), it has become popular as the subject of winter flower festivals in Tokyo and Niigata. The plant is also a common subject in Japanese artwork from the 19th century, which depicts cultivars with colours and petal shapes which are not believed to be extant in the present day; cultivation of the plant tailed off following the Meiji Restoration, regaining popularity in the 1970s with the discovery of several unique natural varieties near Niigata, leading to a renewed interest in developing liverleaf cultivars.

== Gallery ==
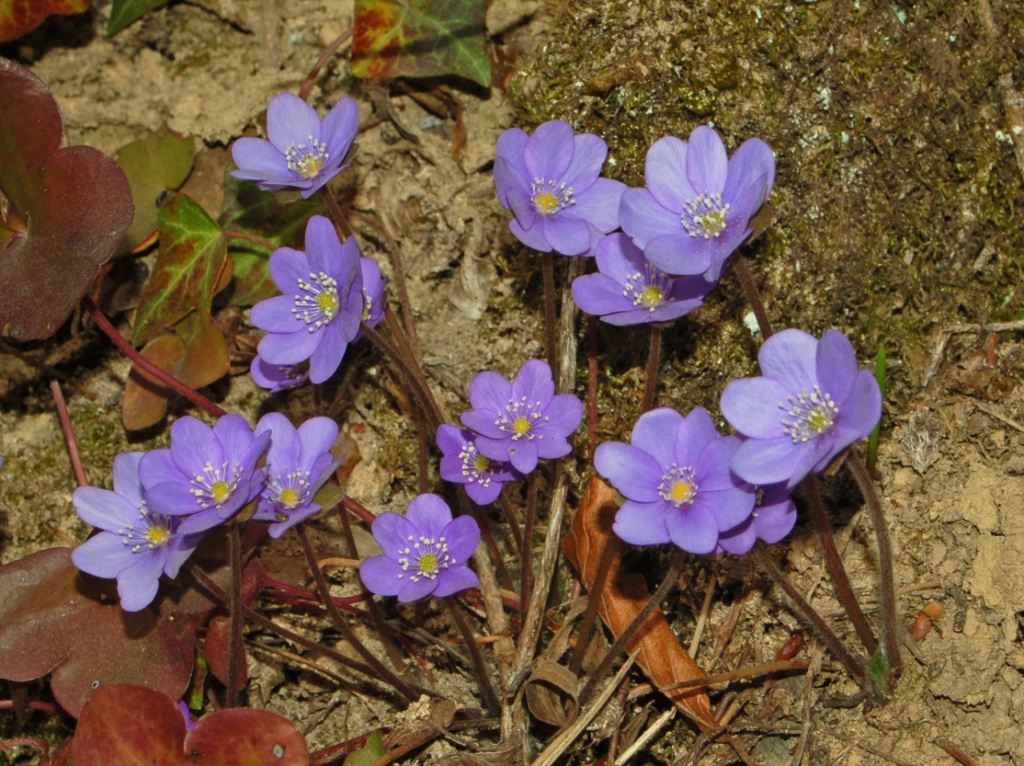

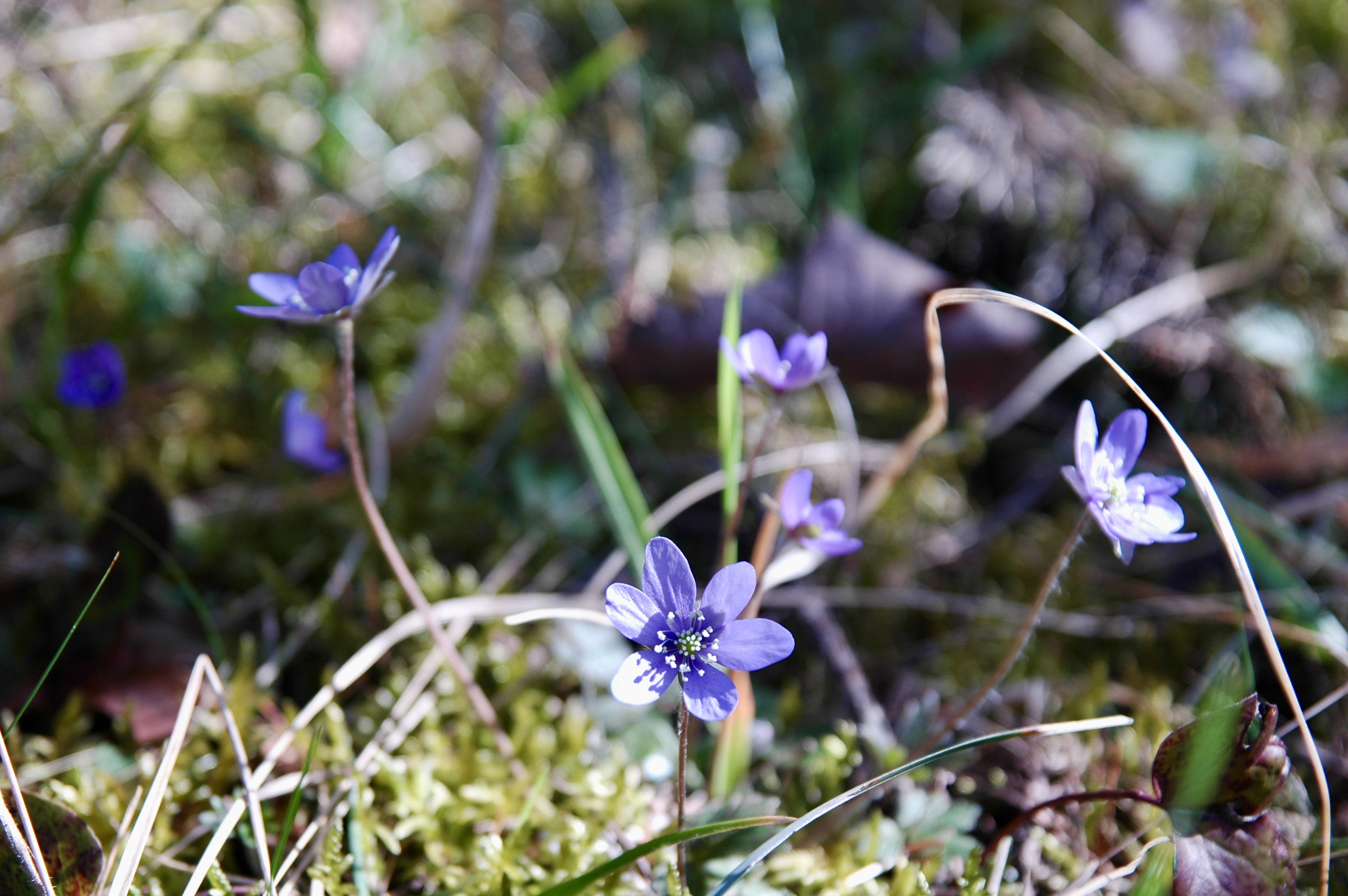

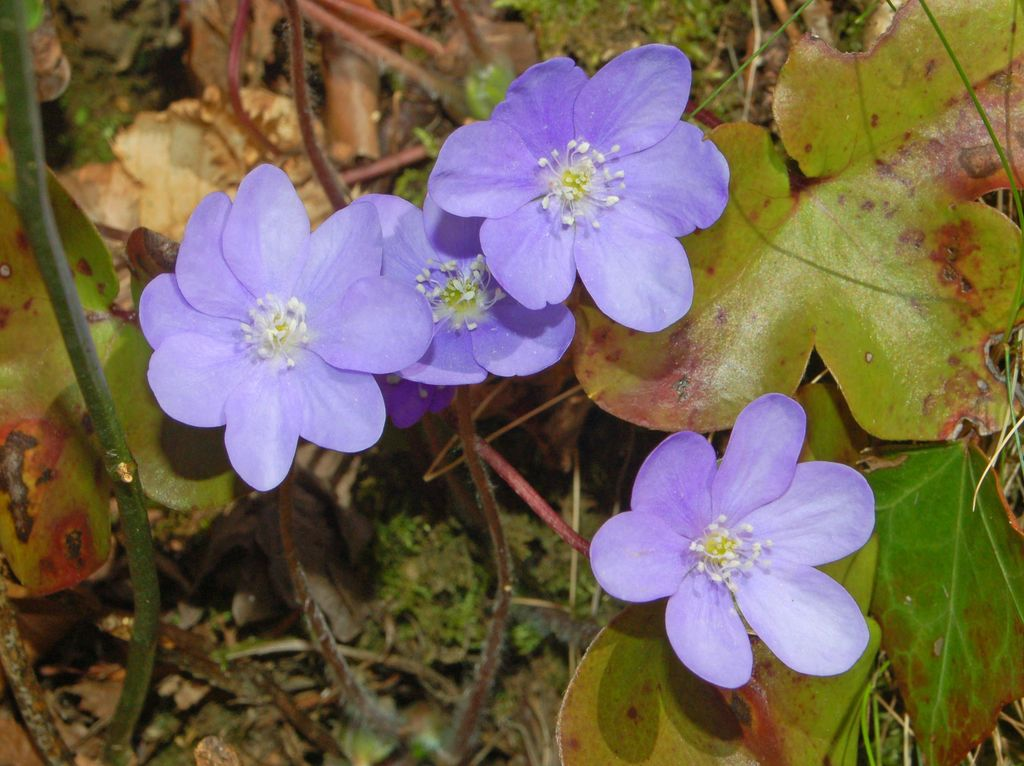

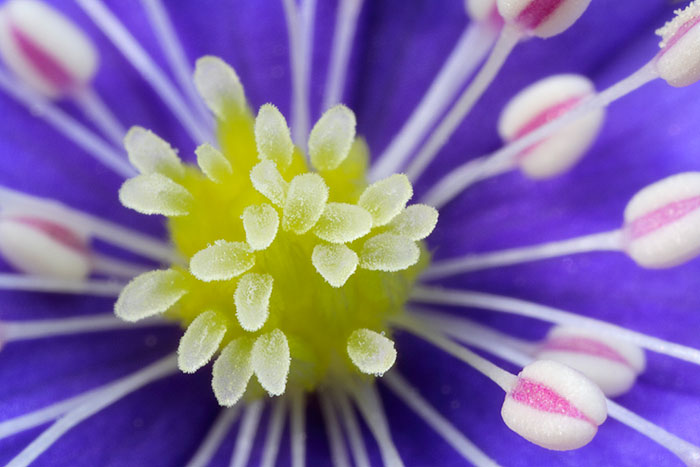

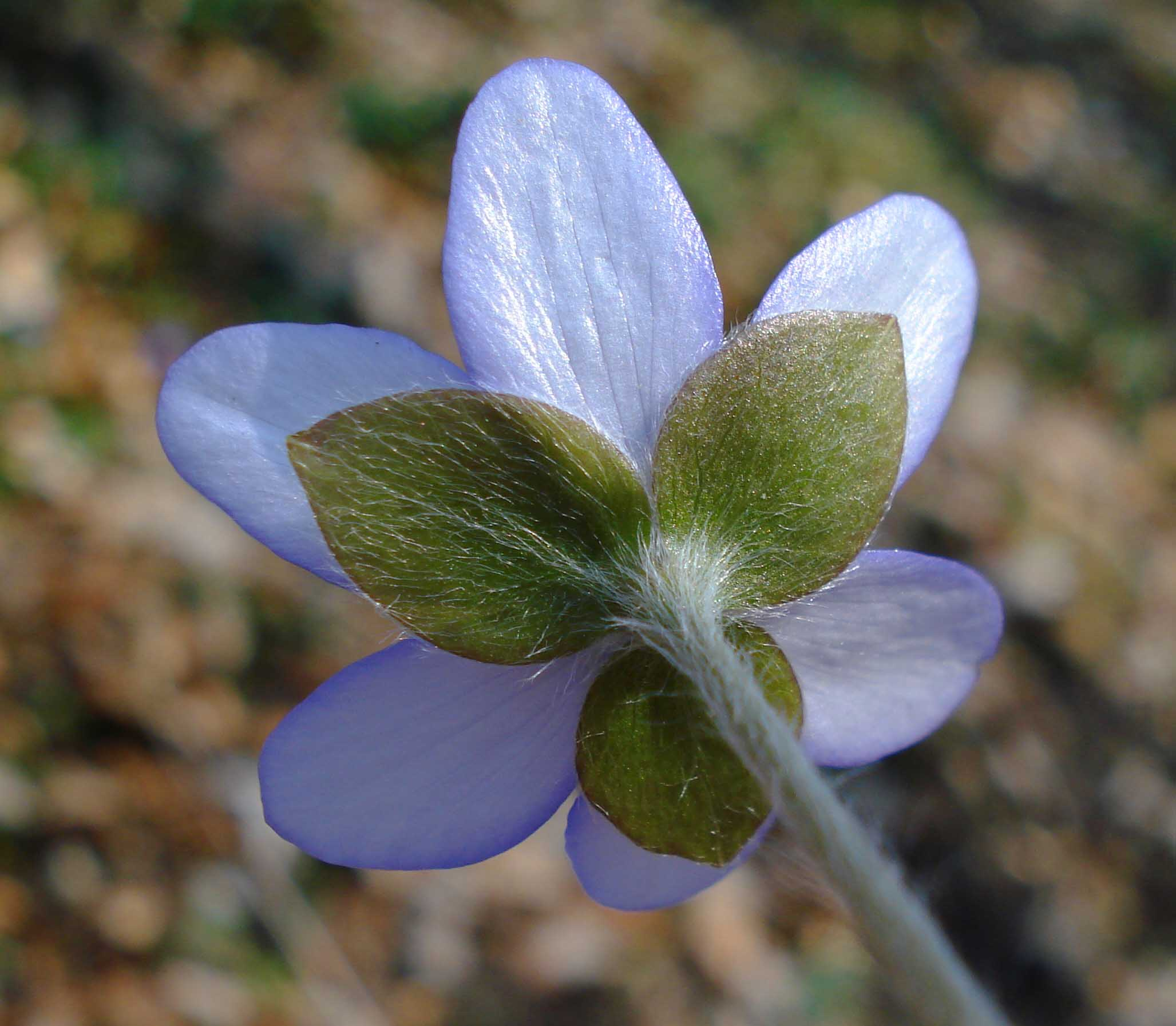

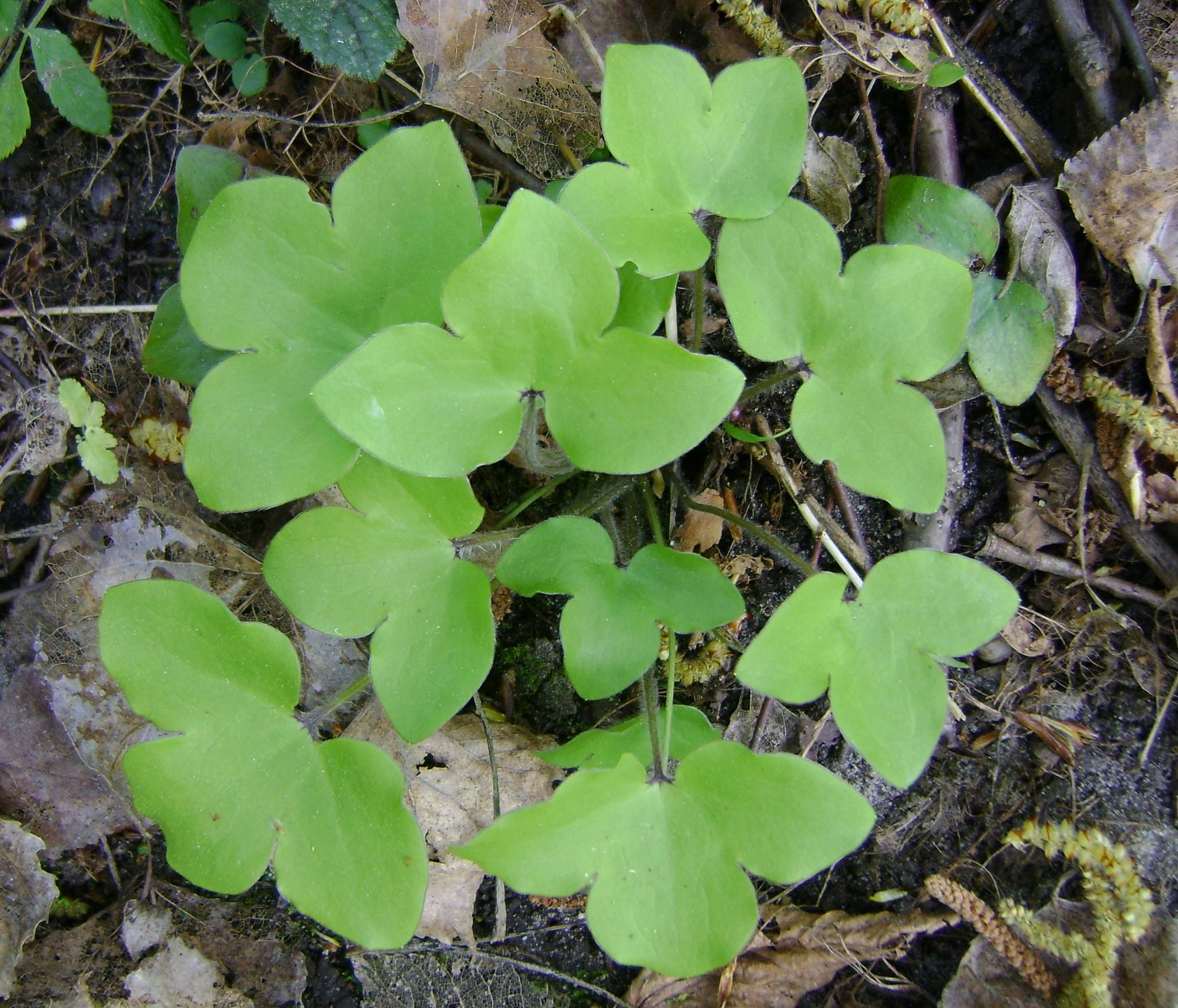
