= Christ and the Virgin Diptych =

Lost diptych by Dieric Bouts

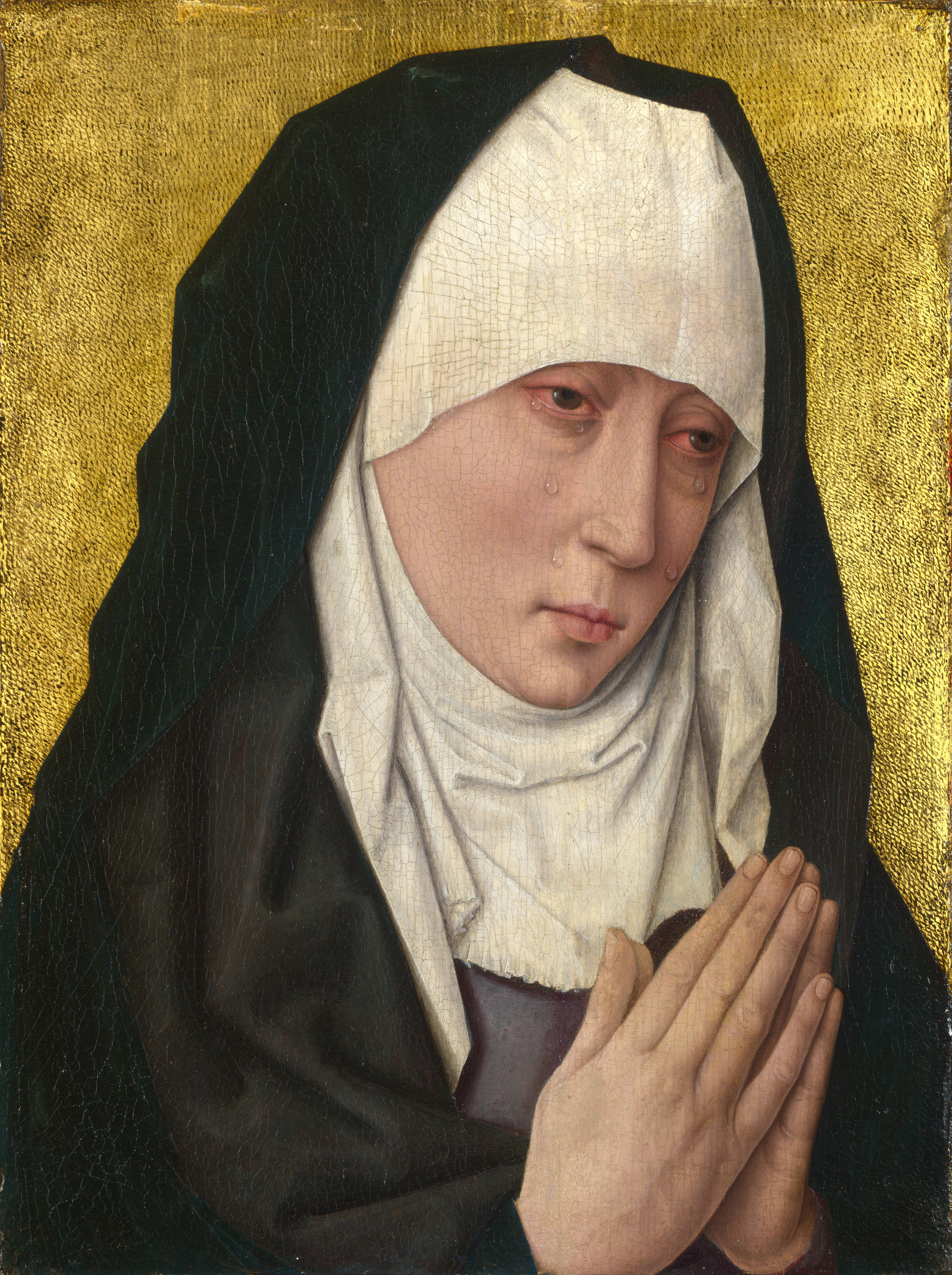
Mater Dolorosa. Workshop of Dieric Bouts, c 1470–75. 36.8 x 27.8 cm. National Gallery, London.

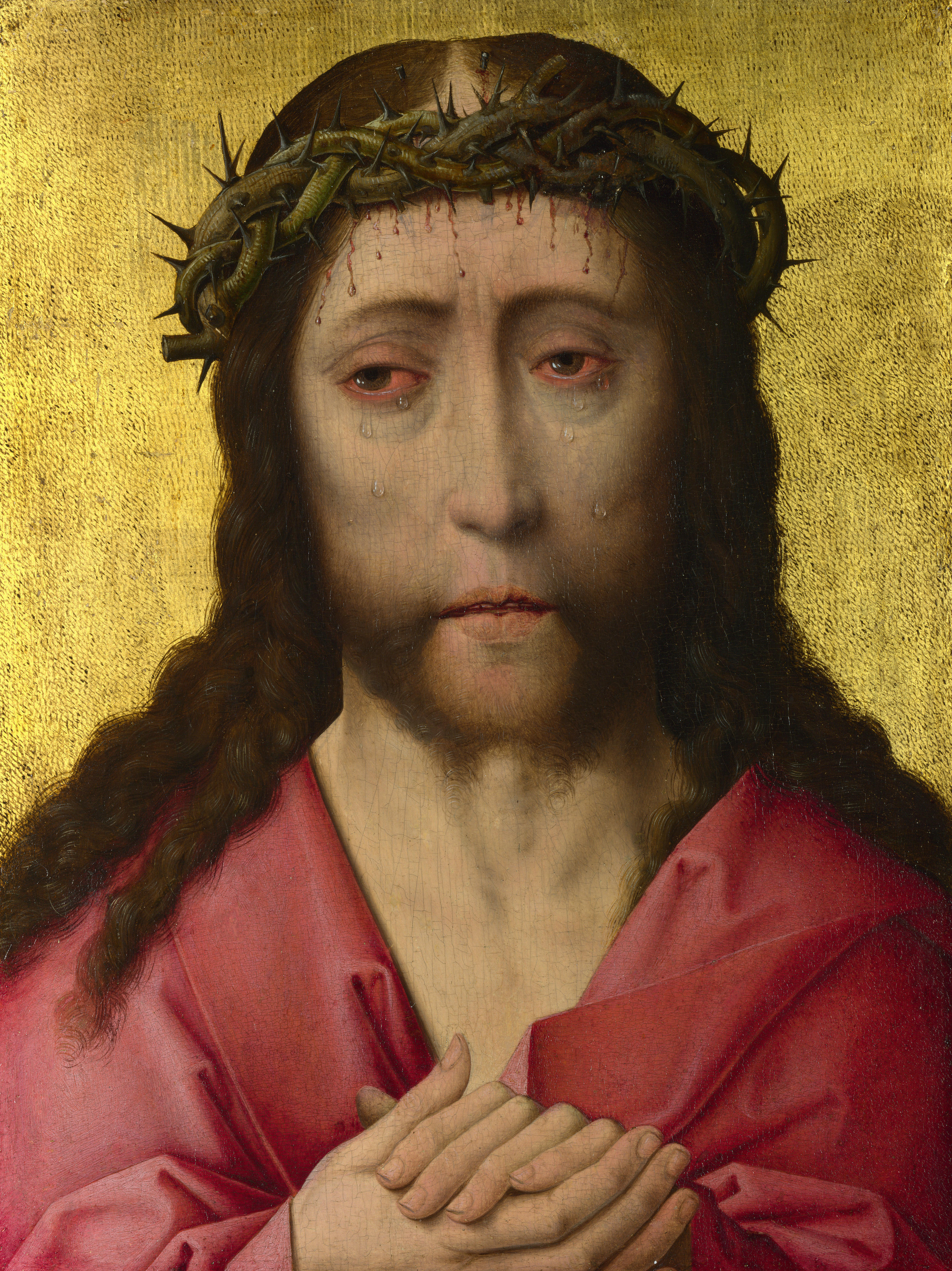
Christ Crowned with Thorns. Workshop of Dieric Bouts, c 1470–75. 36.8 x 27.8 cm. National Gallery, London.

The Christ and the Virgin Diptych consisted of two small oil on oak panel paintings by the Early Netherlandish painter Dirk Bouts (also called Dieric Bouts) completed c. 1470–1475. Originally they formed the wings of a hinged devotional diptych.

The original autograph diptych is lost, although numerous versions of generally rather poor quality survive including a near identical diptych in the Louvre and a similar diptych in Toronto. Other versions of each panel survive. The best versions of the Mater Dolorosa are in the Art Institute of Chicago and in the Weissberger collection at Madrid. The Chicago version was probably painted by Bout's son Dieric Bouts the Younger, about whom nothing is known. A good version of the Christ is in the collection of the Duchess of Osuna at Seville. At least ten other versions are known, including one from the workshop of Dirk Bouts in the National Gallery, London.

Although devotional diptychs were common in mid-15th century northern art, they typically, following the innovations of the highly commercially successful Rogier van der Weyden – whom Bouts was known to have been influenced by – showed a saint paired with a donor. This example is unusual in that both wings depict members of the holy family.

== Description ==
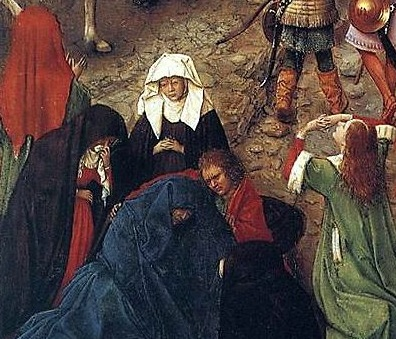
Jan van Eyck, Crucifixion and Last Judgement diptych, c 1440. Women swoon in mourning at the foot of the cross. Mary is shown in the blue gown, swooning in dramatic grief and despair, supported John the Evangelist.

Bouts depicts the Virgin Mary as the "Mater Dolorosa" (Our Lady of Sorrows). She is shown with reddened eyes full of tears that spill down her cheeks. Her head is bowed in grief, and although she looks outwards, her expression is reflective and introspective. Her eyes – like those of Christ on the right panel – are coyly and dignifiedly averted from the viewer. Hers are downcast, his equally tear reddened eyes gaze to his right. In comparison to the passionate and expressively rendered depictions of Mary's suffering in the art of Bouts' near contemporaries Jan van Eyck or Rogier van der Weyden, here, Mary's grief is highly restrained and, according to art historian Joseph Van der Elst, all the more "appealing and deeply moving. She is timeless like human suffering."

Christ is shown in suffering and in pain, reflecting one of two broad styles of single portrait representation popular in the mid to later 15th century, both of which showed his head in either near close up isolation, in half length. The representation of Christ in the "Holy Face" format dates back to Byzantine Icons and the motif was popularised again by Robert Campin and the lost van Eyck frontal representation of Christ known through a copy in the Staatliche Preussischer Kulturbesitz Museen, Berlin.

The second popular means of presenting the heads of Christ, that of the "Man of Sorrows", or "Dead Christ", dates from Roman imagery and is usually less formal, less strictly frontal than Holy Face representations, and focuses on the suffering and passion of the biblical tales. Perhaps the most notable example of the latter is Geertgen tot Sint Jans's Man of Sorrows c. 1485–95. Bouts' earlier right hand panel is similarly typical, showing Christ bleeding at the forehead from incisions made by the Crown of Thorns. A very similar c 1470 work attributed to Bouts, is comparable in composition, colorisation and tone, and is today in the London National Gallery.

In this work Bouts shifts the emphasis and presents both Christ and Mary in the tradition, with Mary now presented as the Woman of Sorrow.

== Gallery ==
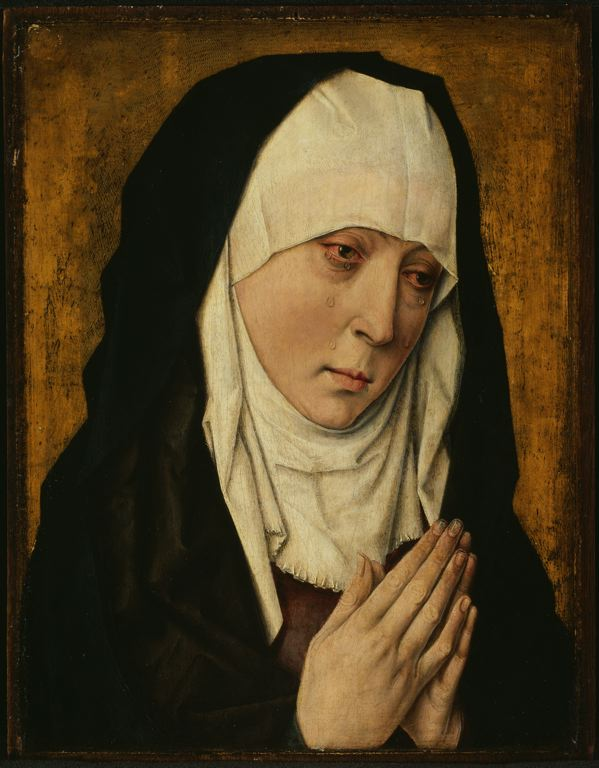
Mater Dolorosa. Workshop of Dieric Bouts the Younger, c. 1470–75. 38.7 × 30.3 cm. Art Institute of Chicago.

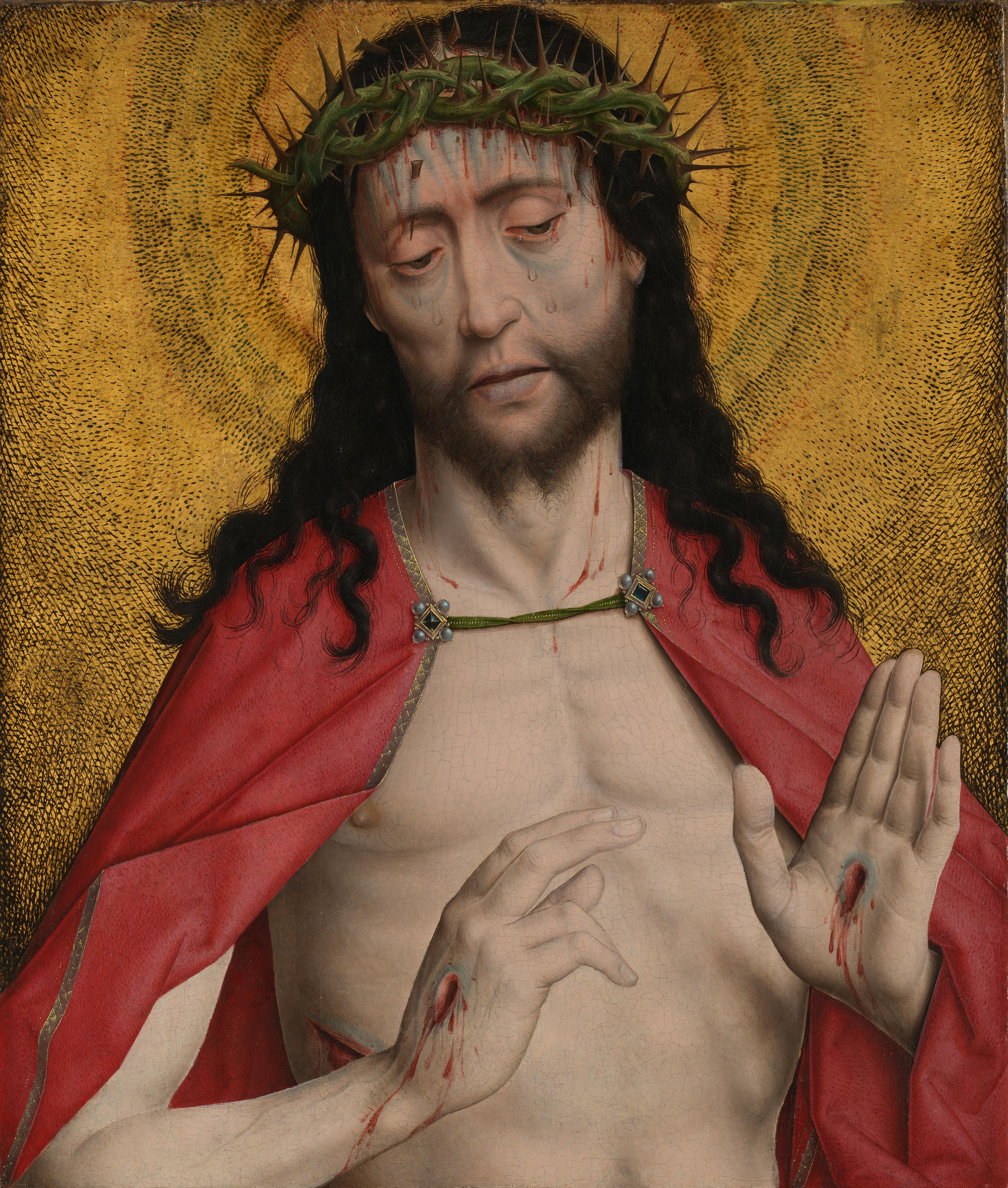
Christ Crowned with Thorns, Dirk Bouts, c. 1470. Oil with egg tempera, National Gallery, London.

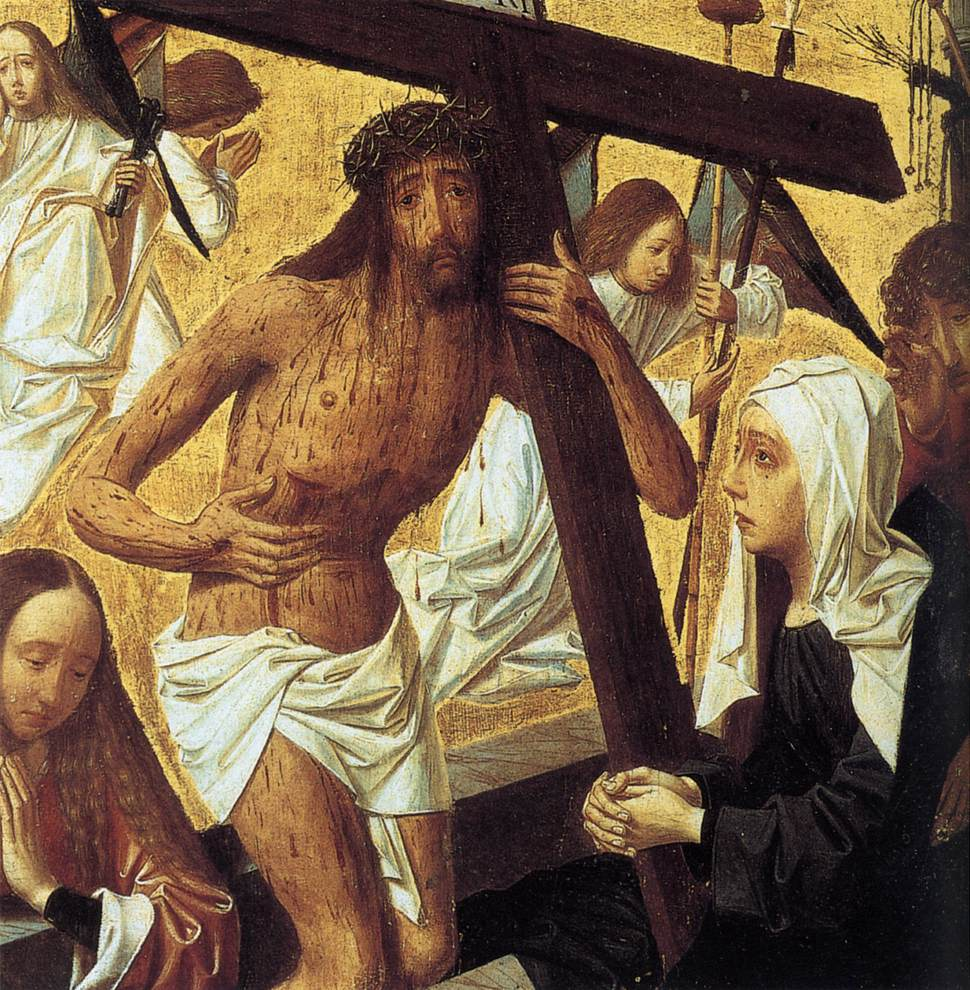
Man of Sorrows, Geertgen tot Sint Jans c. 1485–95. Oil on wood, Museum Catharijneconvent, Utrecht.

== Sources ==
- Campbell, Lorne. The Fifteenth Century Netherlandish Schools. London: National Gallery Publications, 1998. ISBN 1-85709-171-X
- Van der Elst, Joseph. The Last Flowering of the Middle Ages. Kessinger Publishing, 2005. ISBN 1-4191-3806-5
- Wolff, Martha. "An Image of Compassion: Dieric Bouts's 'Sorrowing Madonna'". Art Institute of Chicago Museum Studies, 15/2, 1989. 112–125; 174–175
