= Andachtsbilder =

Religious image

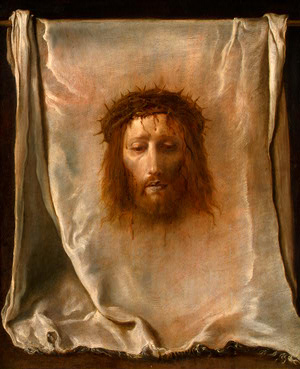
Veil of Veronica by the Italian Baroque painter Domenico Fetti

Andachtsbilder (singular Andachtsbild, German for devotional image) is a German term often used in English in art history for Christian devotional images designed as aids for prayer or contemplation. The images "generally show holy figures extracted from a narrative context to form a highly focused, and often very emotionally powerful, vignette".

The term is especially used of Northern Gothic art around the 14th and 15th centuries, when new subjects such as the Pietà, Pensive Christ, Man of Sorrows, Arma Christi, Veil of Veronica, the severed head of John the Baptist, and the Virgin of Sorrows became extremely popular. (Note: Snyder (1985) and, much more fully, Schiller (1972) cover these passim, see their indexes. Schiller's translator always translates the German term to "devotional images" etc.)

== Subjects and genres ==
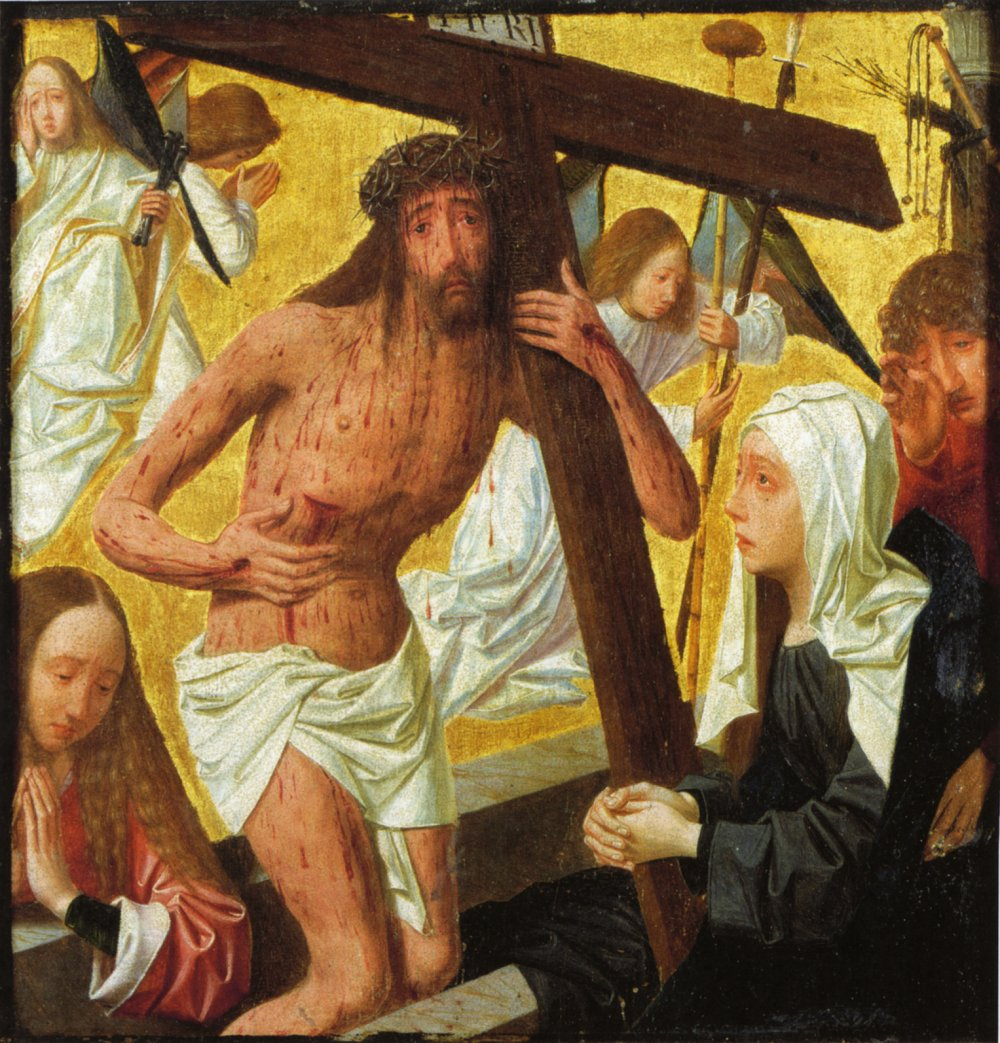
Man of Sorrows, Geertgen tot Sint Jans, Dutch, 1486, 25 x 24 cm, Museum Catharijneconvent, Utrecht.

Traditional subjects from the narrative of the Passion of Christ such as the Ecce Homo and the Crucifixion of Jesus were also treated in the same way. Though the Crucifix had been treated as an intense, isolated image for centuries, at least as far back as the 10th century Gero Cross in Cologne, many images showed a new emphasis on graphically depicted streaming blood, wounds and contorted poses. This process started around 1300, so the influence appears to be from the Crucifixion to other subjects.

The traditional Ecce Homo is a very crowded scene, in which the figure of Christ is often less prominent than those of his captors, but in the andachtsbilder versions the other figures and complex architectural background have vanished, leaving only Christ, with a plain background in most painted versions (see the example by Antonello da Messina in the gallery below). (Note: There are other small types with just two or three figures—see the Mantegna in the gallery.)

Andachtsbilder have a strong emphasis on the grief and suffering of Christ and the figures close to him. Their use was encouraged by movements such as the Franciscans, the Devotio Moderna and German mysticism in late medieval Europe, which promoted affective meditation on the sufferings of Christ by intense mental visualization ("imitation") of them and their physical effects. The most extreme, even gruesome, examples often came from the eastern edge of the Holy Roman Empire and beyond in Poland, Lithuania and the Baltic states, where large carved gobbets of congealed blood can cover the body. (Note: Examples (Archived July 27, 2011, at the Wayback Machine) from the National Museum, Warsaw) But the style spread all over Europe, including Italy, although the extremes of emotionalism were avoided there until the Baroque.

== Scope ==
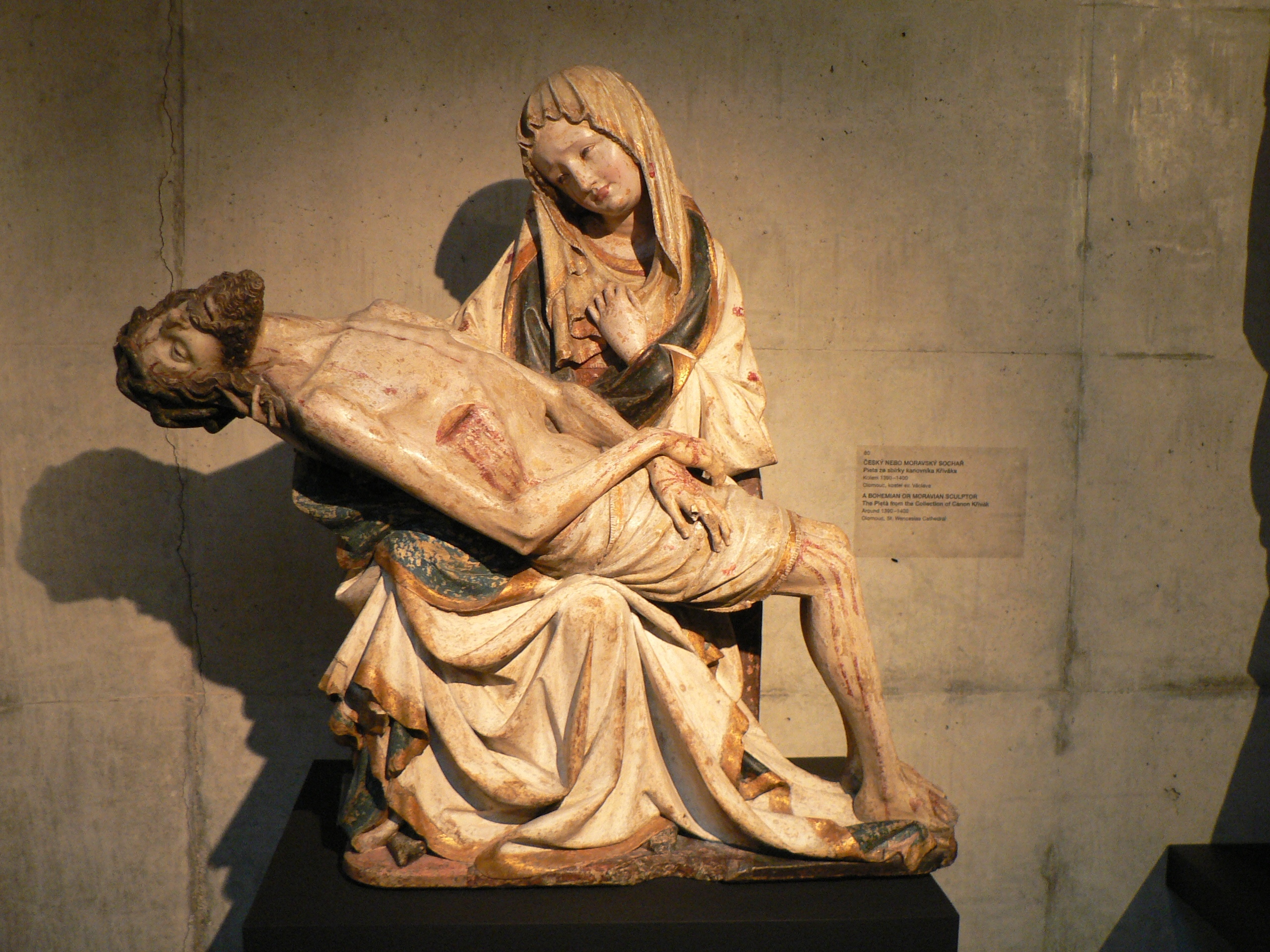
Early Bohemian Pietà of 1390–1400

=== Sculptures ===
The term was first devised for a group of mainly sculptural subjects, including the Pietà and Pensive Christ, that were thought to have emerged in convents in south-western Germany in the 14th century, although their history is now believed to be more complicated.

In churches such images were often given a side-chapel, and sometimes are given special places in the rituals of Holy Week. For example, consecrated hosts might be stored in the cavity of the spear wound in a sculpted Pietà between Good Friday and Easter Sunday.

=== Paintings, carvings, and prints ===
The term is often used specifically for small works intended for personal contemplation in the home. By the 15th century the emerging urban middle classes of Northern Europe were increasingly able to afford small paintings or carvings. The depiction was often very "close-up", with a half-length figure occupying nearly the whole picture space. Andachtsbilder subjects were also very common in prints. However larger works for churches or outdoor display are also covered by the term.

By the mid-15th century andachtsbilder were influencing large monumental works, a process James Snyder discusses in relation to major works such as Rogier van der Weyden's Prado Deposition, the Isenheim Altarpiece of Matthias Grünewald, and the carved Altarpiece of the Holy Blood by Tilman Riemenschneider at Rothenburg ob der Tauber. The Mass of St Gregory, which included a vision of the Man of Sorrows, was a composition often used on altarpieces which took a common andachtsbilder subject and expanded it into a subject suitable for more monumental works.

The art historian Jeffrey F. Hamburger observed that the term has now "lost whatever precision it could ever lay claim to, having been applied to virtually any object that might have been used to stimulate devotional experience". Although works in the andachtsbilder tradition remained very popular in Catholic art for centuries, for example in Baroque Spain and Italy, the term is less likely to be applied to much later images. The English term "devotional image" or "picture" etc. can apply to a wide range of images, in all media, included modern commercially printed reproductions or prayer cards, especially those featuring a portrait-like image rather than a narrative scene.

== Gallery ==
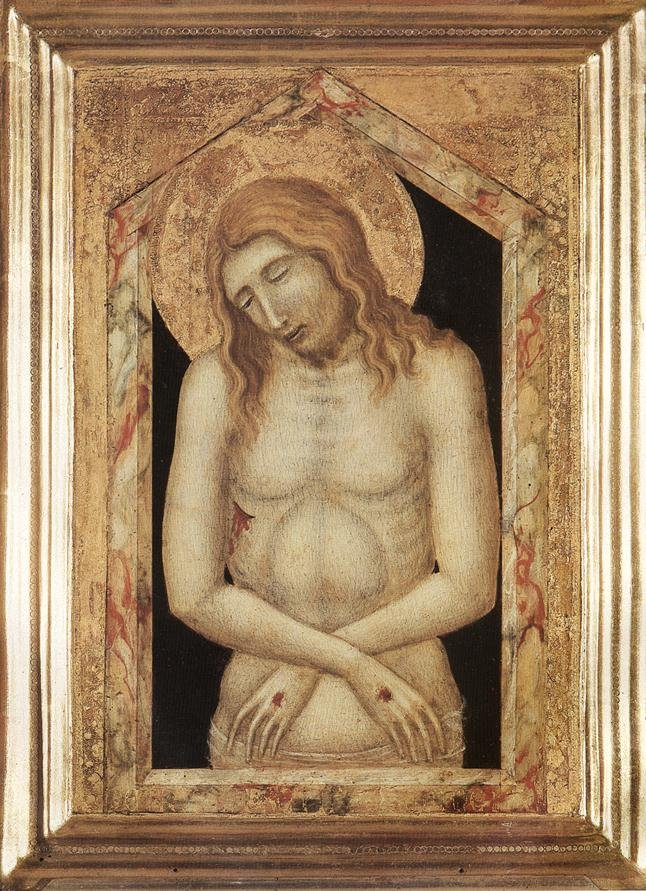
An early Man of Sorrows by the Italian artist Pietro Lorenzetti, c. 1330

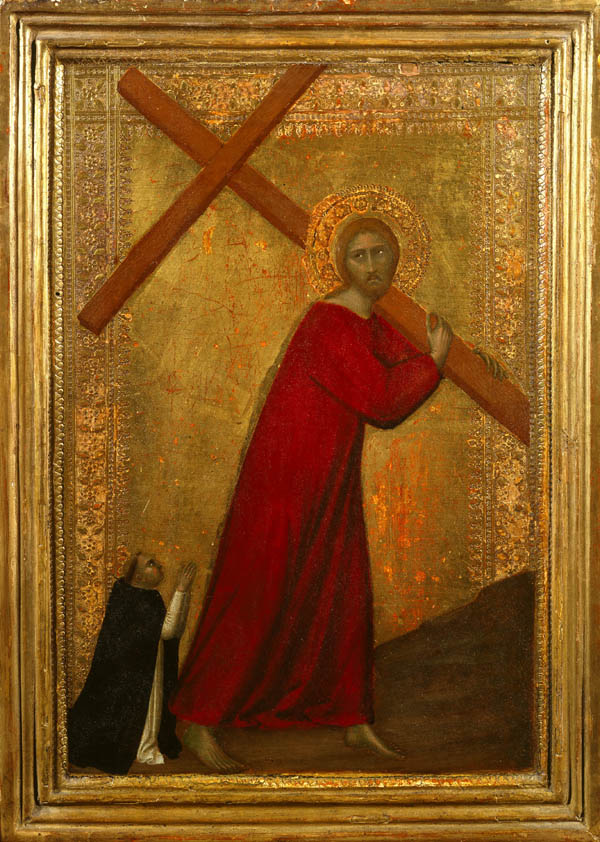
Christ carrying the Cross, with a donor portrait of a Dominican friar, Barna da Siena, 1330–1350

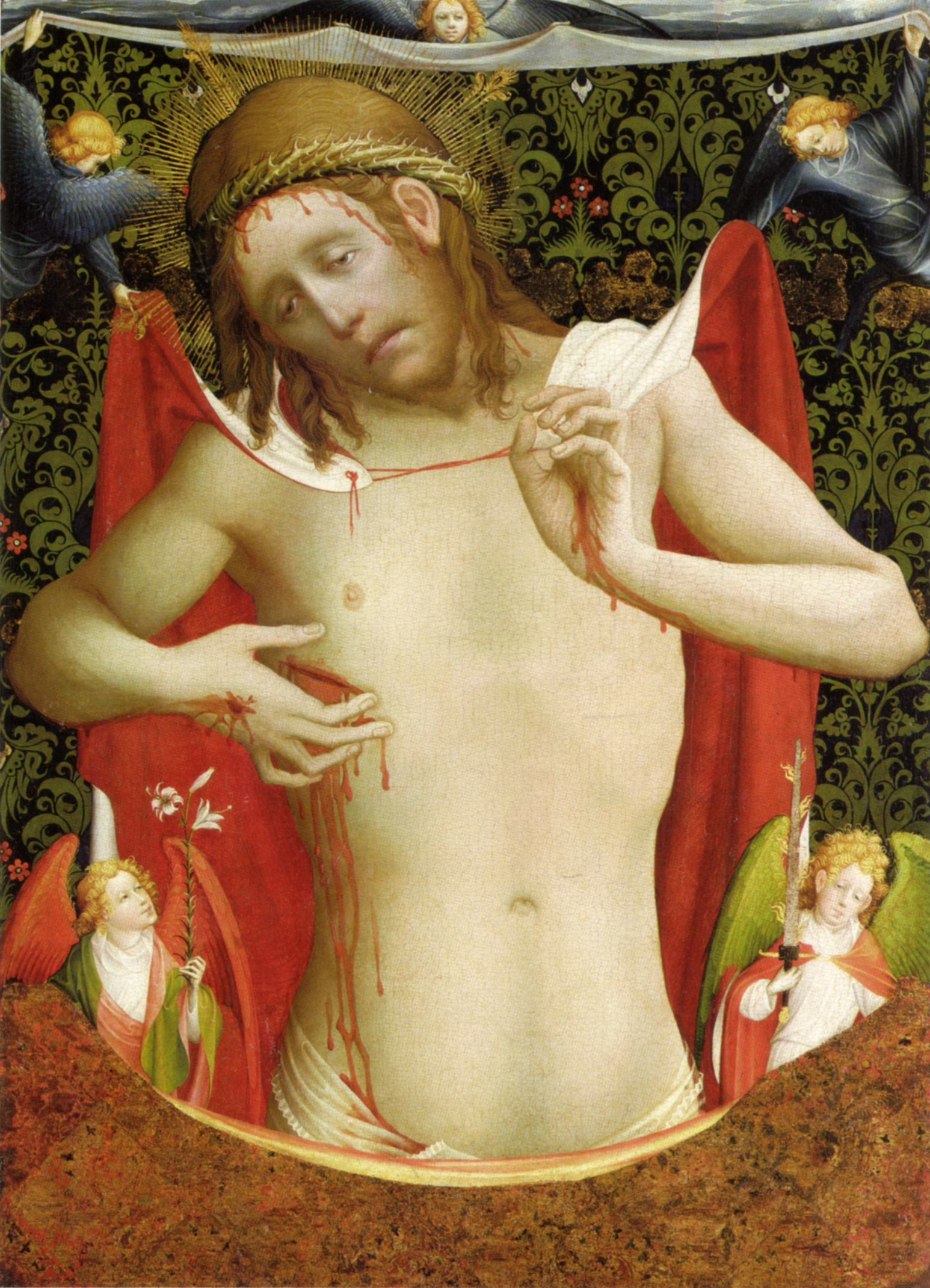
Man of Sorrows by the North German artist Meister Francke, c. 1435.

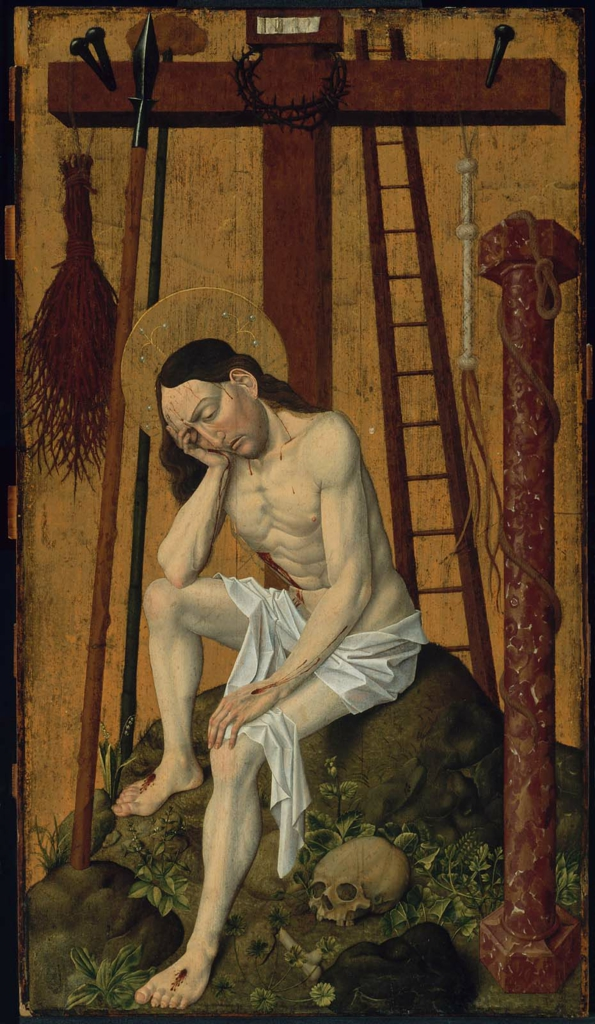
Pensive Christ with the Arma Christi, German, 1450–60

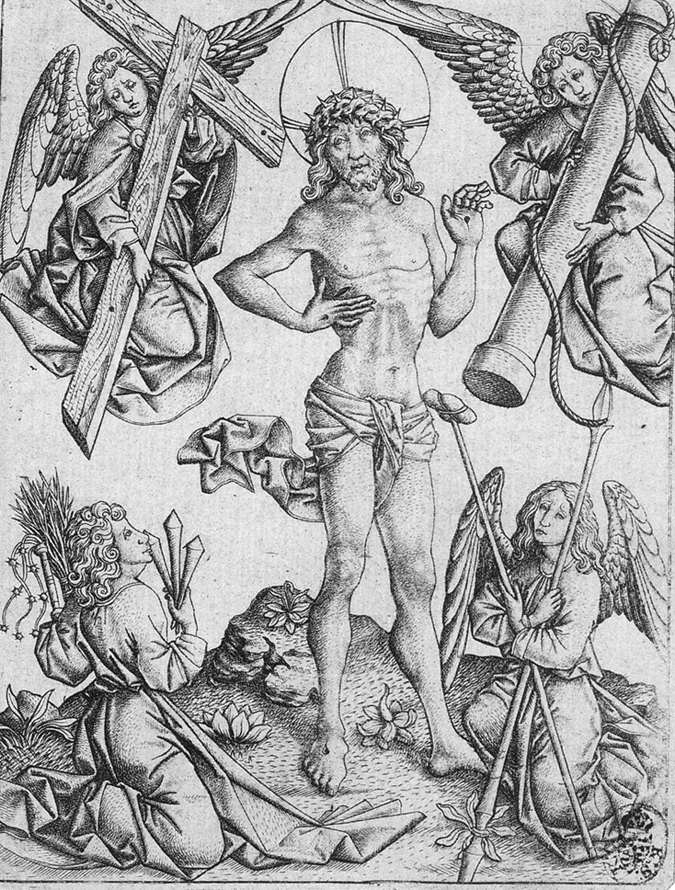
Engraving of c. 1460 by Master E. S. of the Man of Sorrows with the Arma Christi

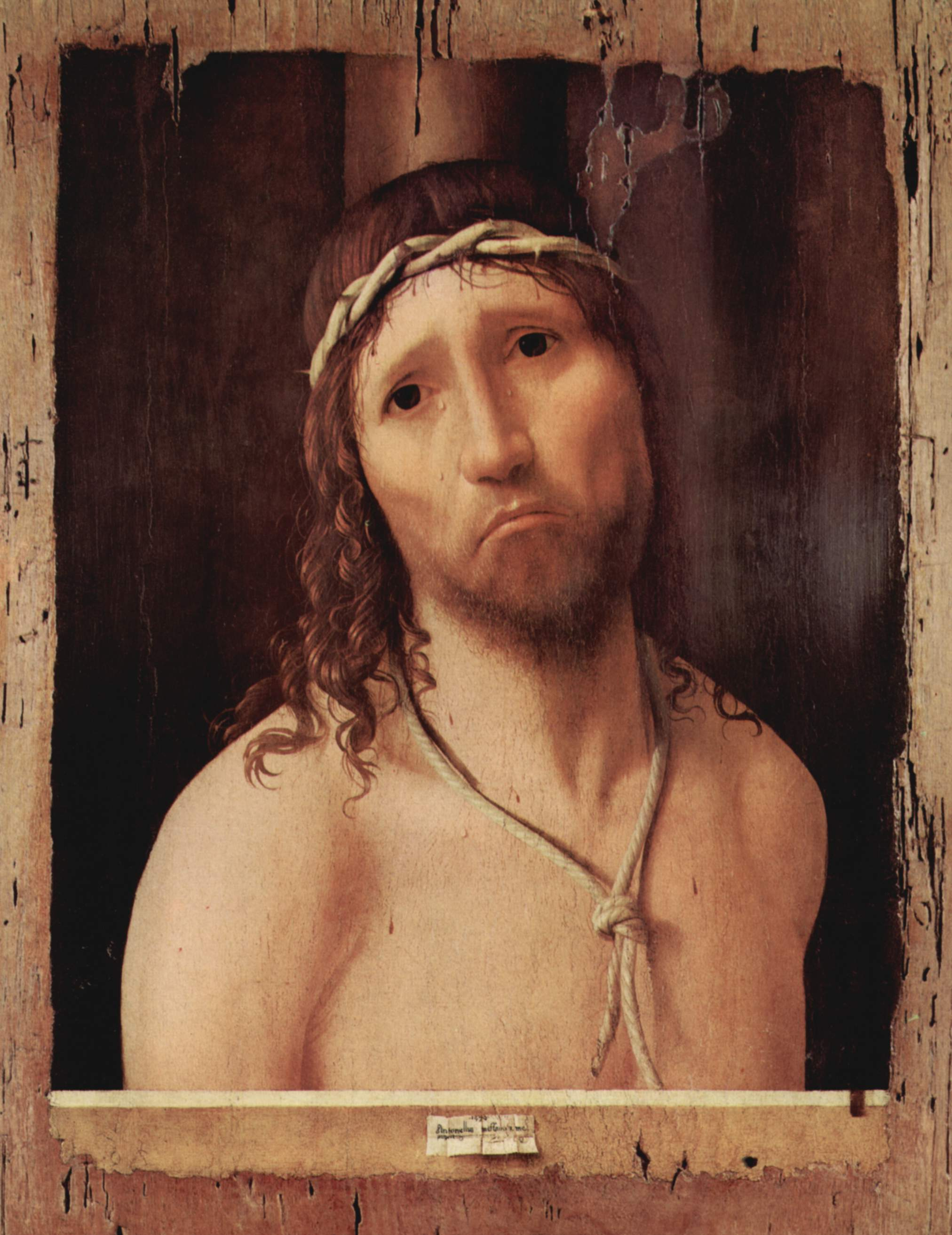
One of several versions of the Ecce Homo by Antonello da Messina, who was influenced by Early Netherlandish painting, c. 1473

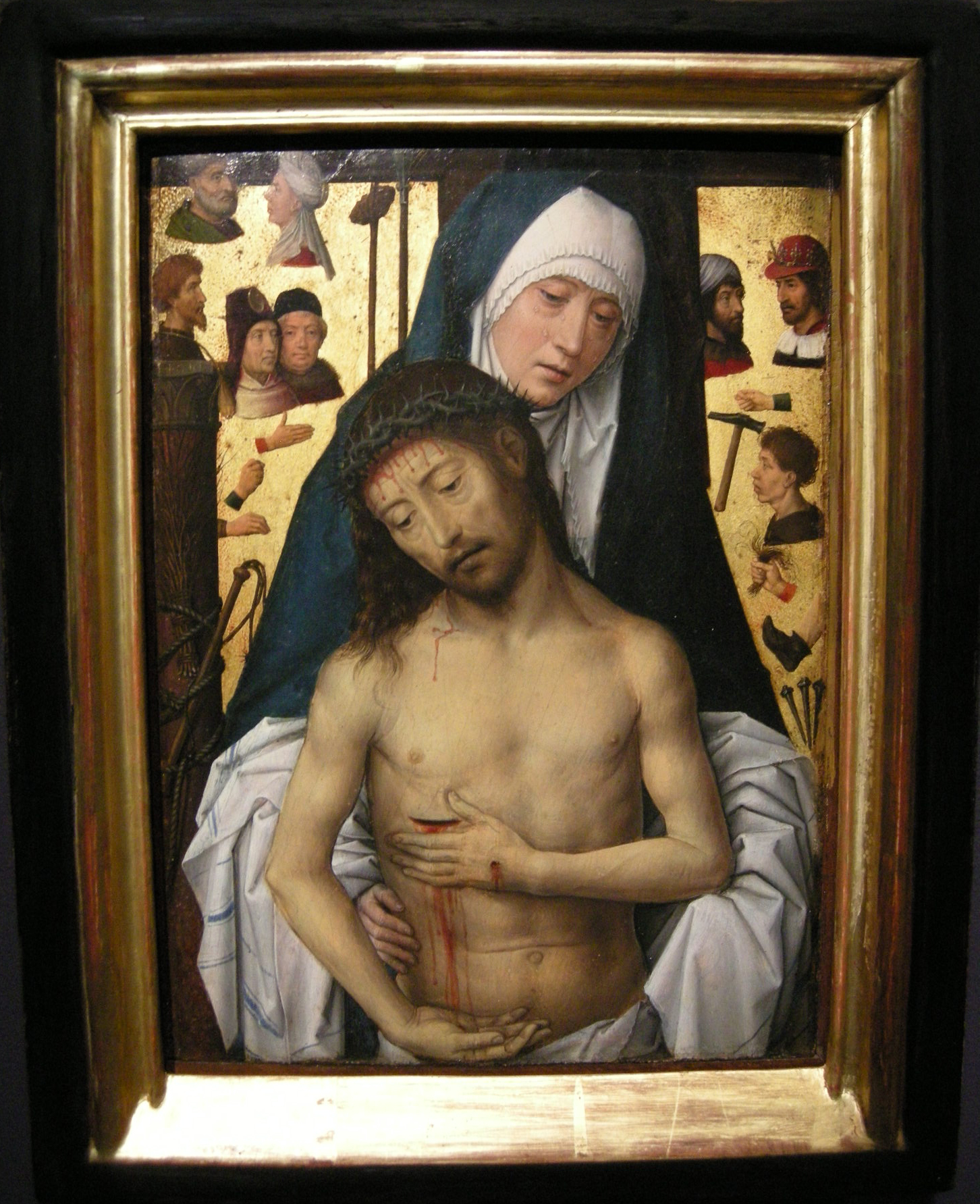
Hans Memling, 1475–79. Sometimes the Instruments of the Passion are expanded, as here, to include heads and disembodied hands of the persecutors.

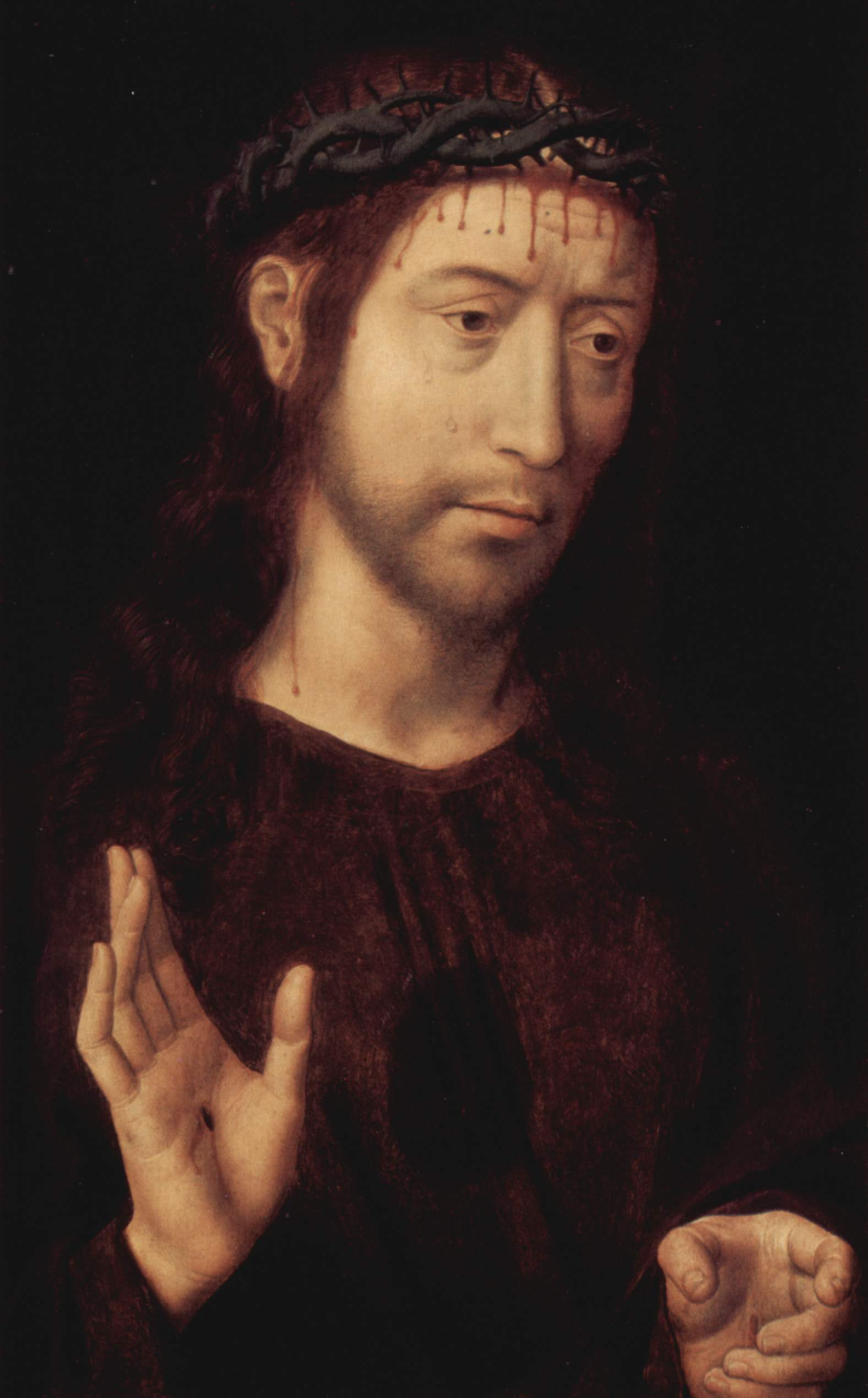
Memling, 1470, showing a typically gentler and less emotive Flemish style.

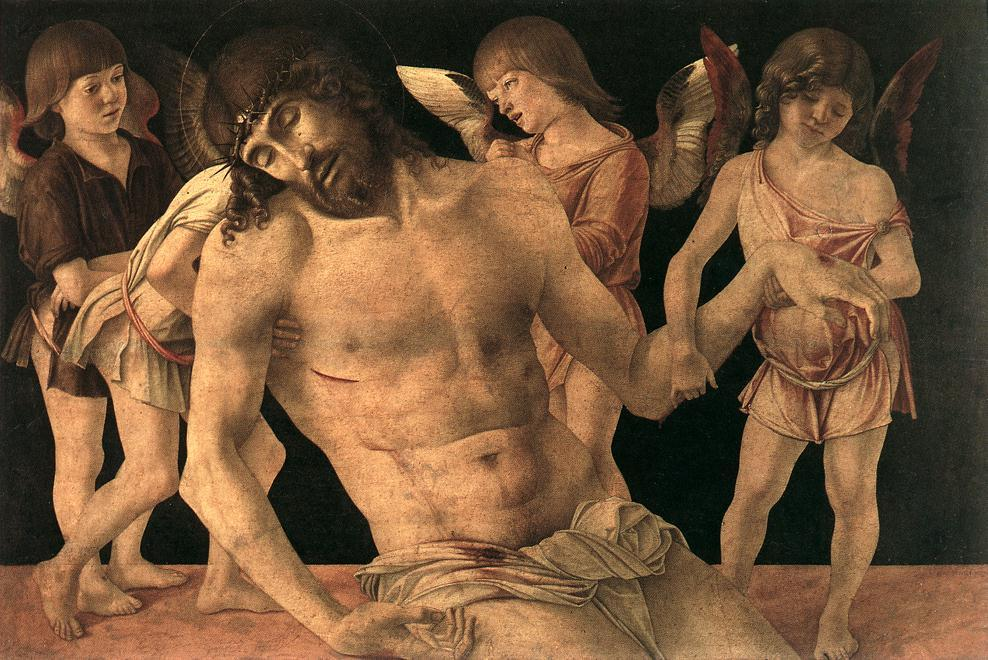
The Venetian Giovanni Bellini painted several andachtsbilder subjects, typically, as here, pulling back somewhat compared to Northern "close-up" treatments.

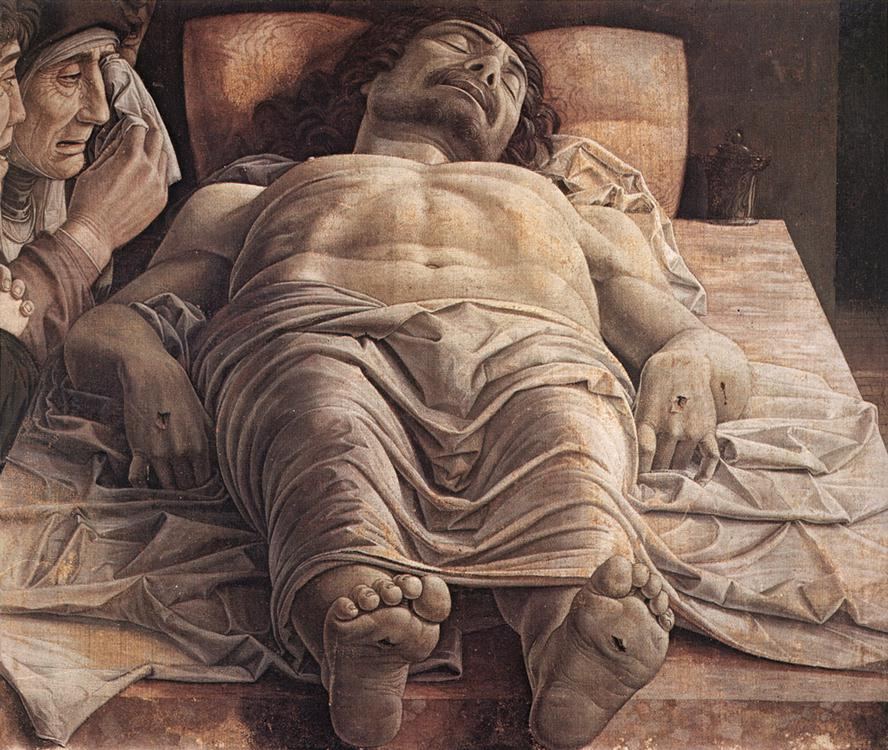
A highly original composition by Andrea Mantegna of the laying-out of the dead Christ, c. 1490.

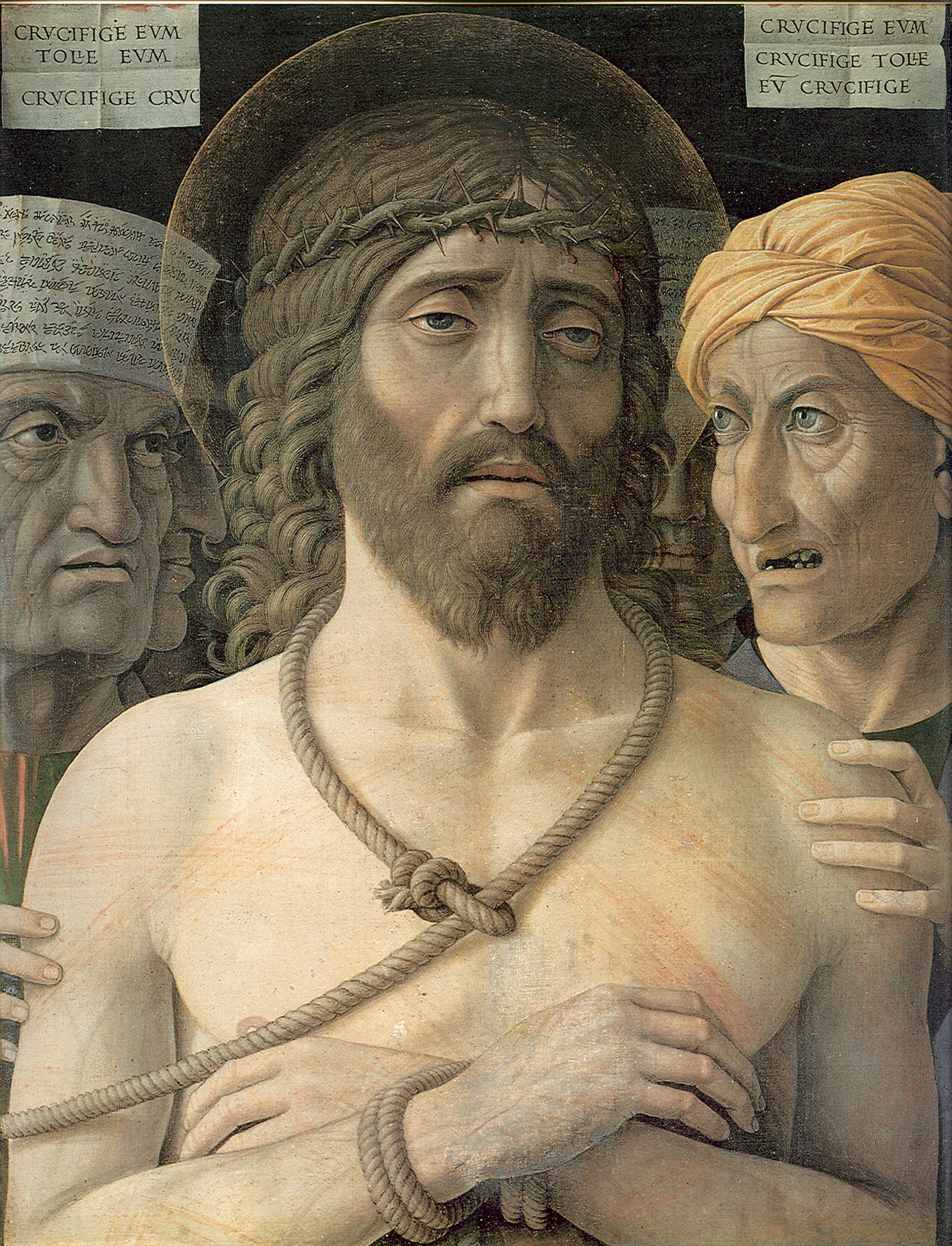
Ecce Homo by Andrea Mantegna, c. 1500, avoids Northern emotionalism, but retains the "close up" composition.

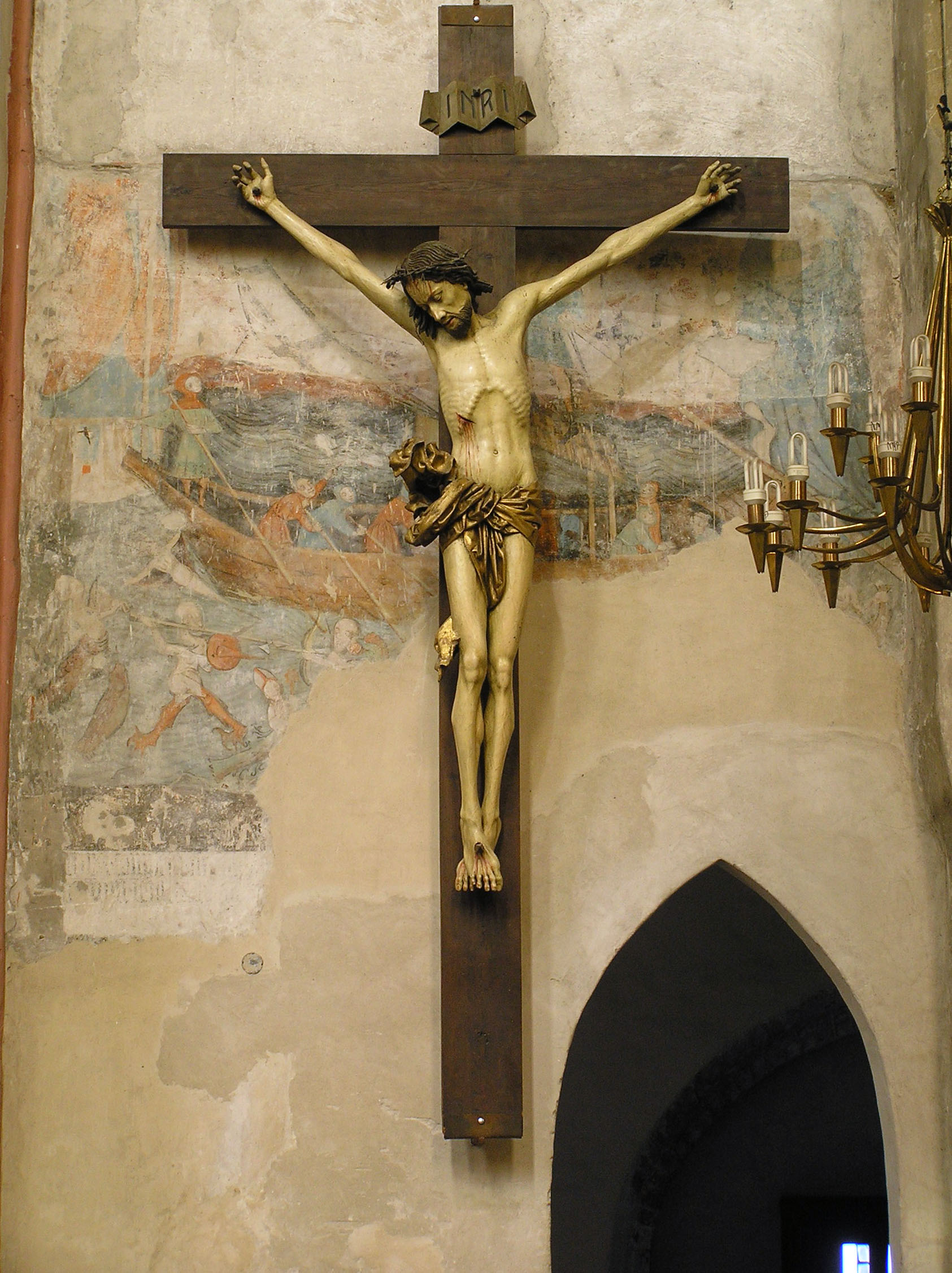
Polish crucifix of c. 1500, showing the andachtsbilder style
