= The Adoration of the Magi (Geertgen tot Sint Jans) =

Painting by Geertgen tot Sint Jans

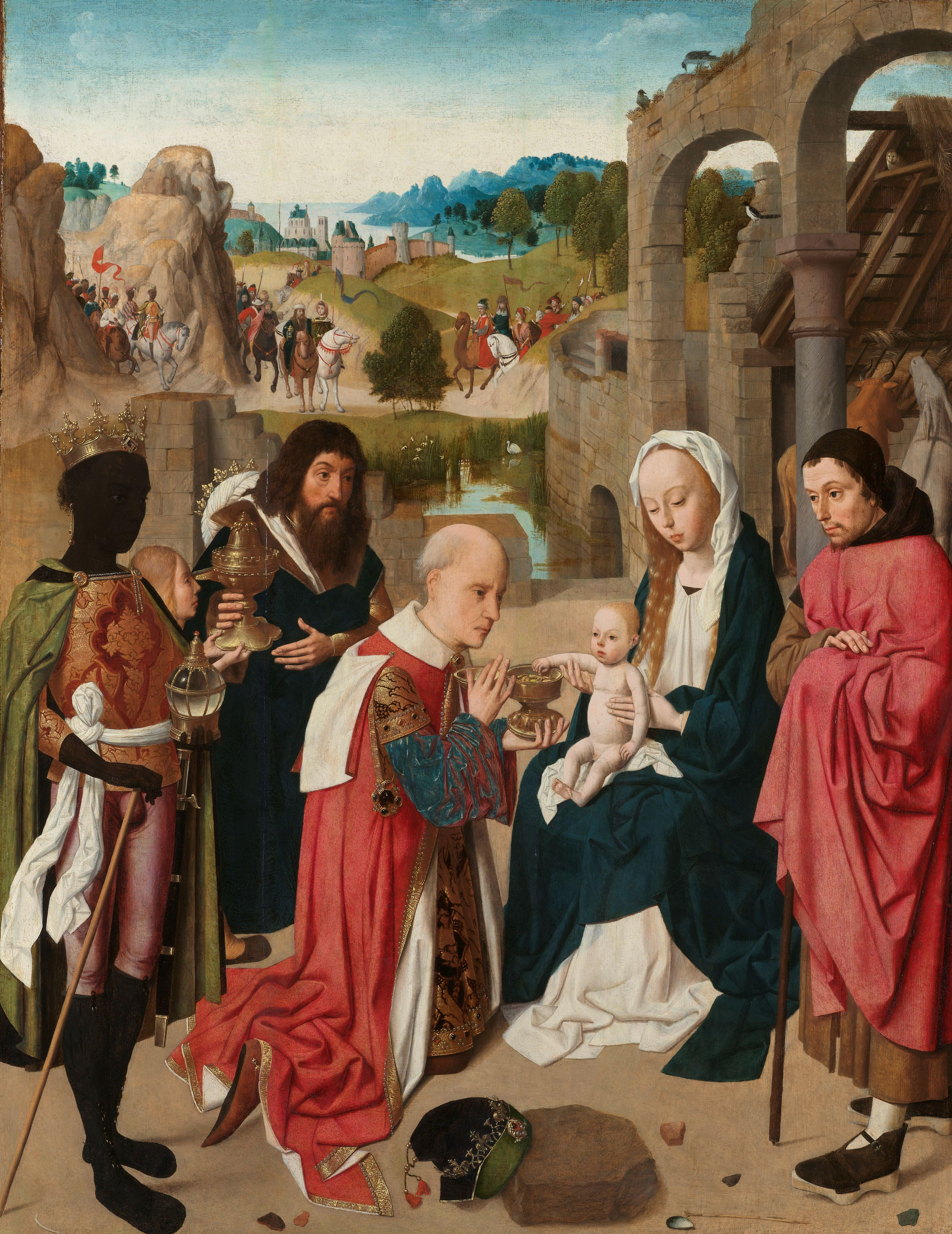
- Artist: Geertgen tot Sint Jans
- Year: c. 1480–1485
- Medium: Oil on wood
- Dimensions: 91.6 cm × 71.8 cm (36.1 in × 28.3 in)
- Location: Rijksmuseum; Amsterdam

The Adoration of the Magi is a circa 1480–1485 oil on panel painting of the Adoration of the Magi by the Renaissance artist Geertgen tot Sint Jans. It is held in the collection of the Rijksmuseum, in Amsterdam.

== Painting ==
The Adoration of the Magi shows the three magi bearing gifts. King Melchior is shown kneeling before Child Jesus and offering his gift of gold coins. His removed crown lies at his feet. Behind him King Caspar, with his crown dangling behind his head, takes his gift of frankincense from an assistant in readiness to present it. On the left King Balthasar, portrayed as a dark-skinned king, still wears his crown and holds an orb of myrrh. In the background the retinue of each of the three magi can be seen above their heads. The magi are thus shown twice, once in the foreground and again in miniature in the background, arriving with their retinue from Africa, Europe and Asia. An x-ray examination of the underdrawing shows that originally the European retinue of Melchior had him riding a horse and this was later changed to a dromedary. This is surprising, because early camels in 'Three Kings' paintings tend to represent the retinue of Balthasar, who was said to have come from Ethiopia (often meant to symbolize the rest of Africa).

== Provenance ==
This painting is one of three paintings of the Adoration of the Magi by Geertgen that have been attributed to him based on stylistic similarities. The provenance of this painting only goes back to its purchase in 1904. Together with the other two versions, it is based on work by Hugo van der Goes in Berlin.

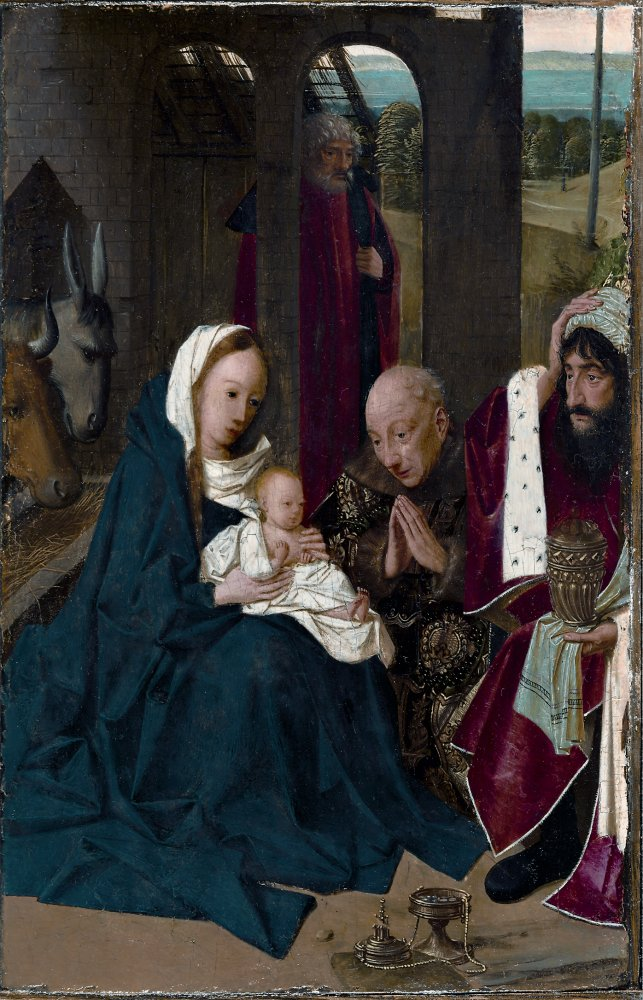
The Adoration of the Kings, Cleveland

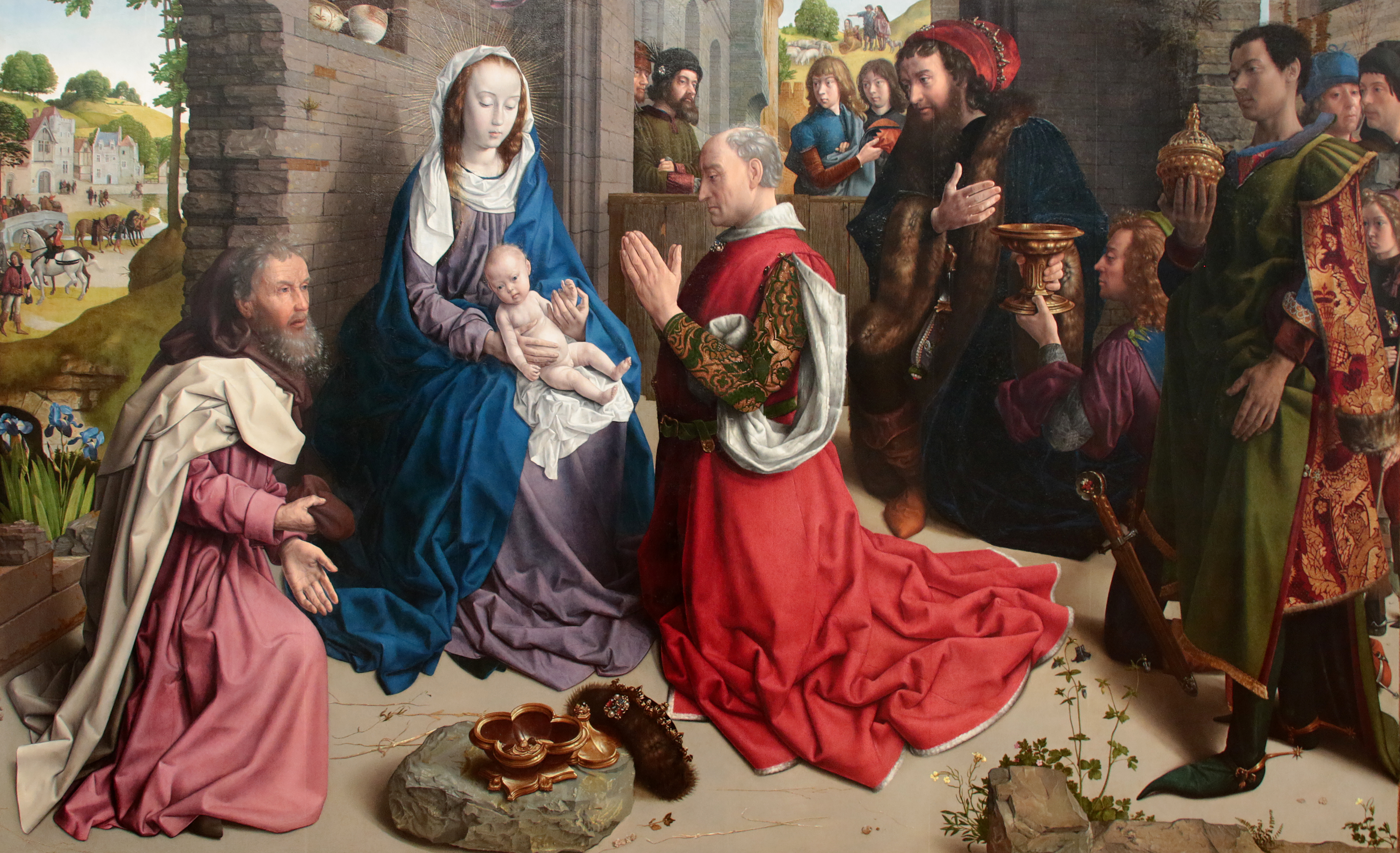
The Adoration of the Kings by Goes (Monforte Altar, Berlin)

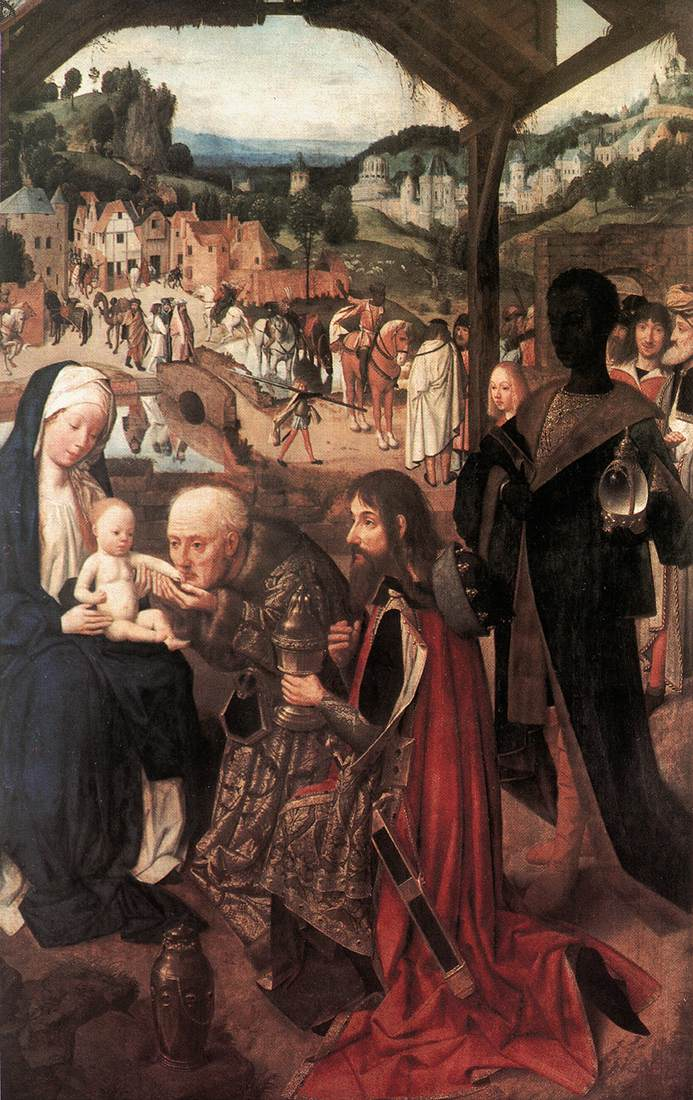
The Adoration of the Kings, Prague
