= The Glorification of the Virgin =

1490s painting by Geertgen tot Sint Jans

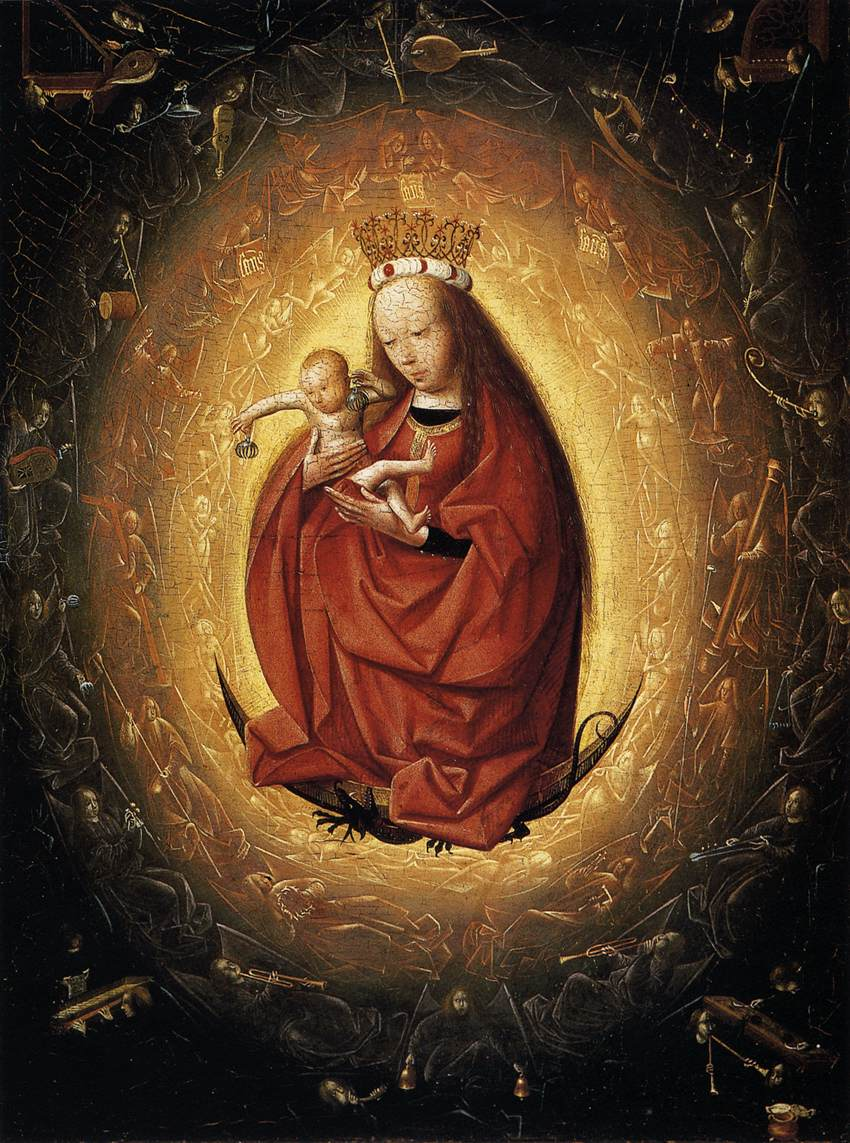
The Glorification of the Virgin, c. 1490–1495. Museum Boijmans Van Beuningen, Rotterdam

The Glorification of the Virgin (Dutch: De verheerlijking van Maria) is a 15th-century painting attributed to Geertgen tot Sint Jans. It was painted c, 1490–1495 and was originally part of a diptych. It shows the Virgin Mary holding Jesus and surrounded by three rings of angels.

Mary wears a crown lined by five white and one red roses. She is surrounded by a two golden radiant and glowing circle. The inner ring contains six angles holding the Arma Christi (instruments of the Passion of Jesus): the cross, spear, crown of thorns, tammer and nails, the whip and the a sponge soaked in vinegar. In the outer ring, musical angels play various instruments and wave bells.

The panel is held in the collection of Museum Boijmans Van Beuningen, Rotterdam, Netherlands.
