= Geertgen tot Sint Jans =

Early Netherlandish painter

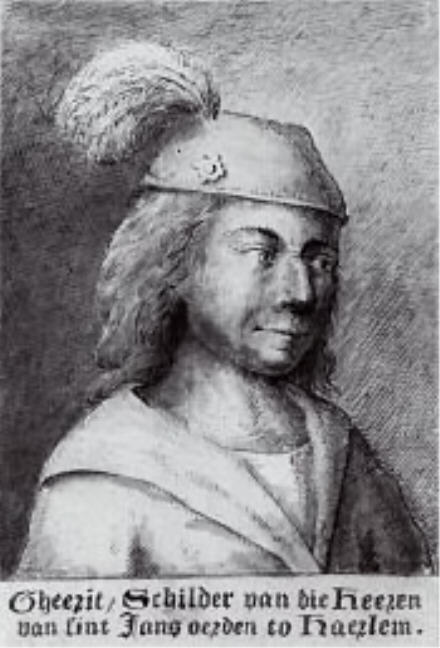
- Geertgen tot Sint Jans
- Born: c. 1465; Leiden, Burgundian Netherlands
- Died: c. 1495 (aged approximately 28); Haarlem, Habsburg Netherlands
- Education: Albert van Ouwater
- Known for: Painting
- Movement: Early Netherlandish painting

Geertgen tot Sint Jans (c. 1465 – c. 1495), also known as Geertgen van Haarlem, Gerrit van Haarlem, Gerrit Gerritsz, Gheertgen, Geerrit, Gheerrit, or any other diminutive form of Gerald, was an Early Netherlandish painter from the northern Low Countries in the Holy Roman Empire. No contemporary documentation of his life has been traced, and the earliest published account of his life and work is from 1604, in Karel van Mander's Schilder-boeck.

According to van Mander, Geertgen was probably a pupil of Albert van Ouwater, one of the first oil painters in the northern Low Countries. Both painters lived in the city of Haarlem, where Geertgen was attached to the house of the Knights of Saint John, perhaps as a lay brother, for whom he painted an altarpiece. In van Mander's book he states that Geertgen took the name of St. John without joining the order, thus his last name "tot Sint Jans" was derived from the order's name and means "unto Saint John".

== Biography ==
Though van Mander calls him Geertgen tot Sint Jans, painter from Haarlem, indicating he was from Haarlem, it is possible that he was perhaps born in Leiden, then in the Burgundian Netherlands in the Holy Roman Empire, around the year 1465. The assignment of Leiden as his birthplace is traceable to a 17th-century print by Jacob Matham, where he is referred to as Gerardus van Leydanus. There is no known archival evidence for this claim by Matham. This print of The Lamentation of Christ from 1620, shows in the lower left corner "Cum privil. Sa Cae. M. – Gerardus Leydanus Pictor ad S. Ia Bapt. Harlemi pinxit" indicating he was a painter from Leiden at St John the Baptist in Haarlem. In the lower right hand corner it says "Theodorus Matham Sculpsit. Iac Matham excud.", which means that son Theo made the sketch from the painting, and father Jacob Matham engraved it. It was printed in Haarlem in 1620, indicating that the painting was still there at that time.

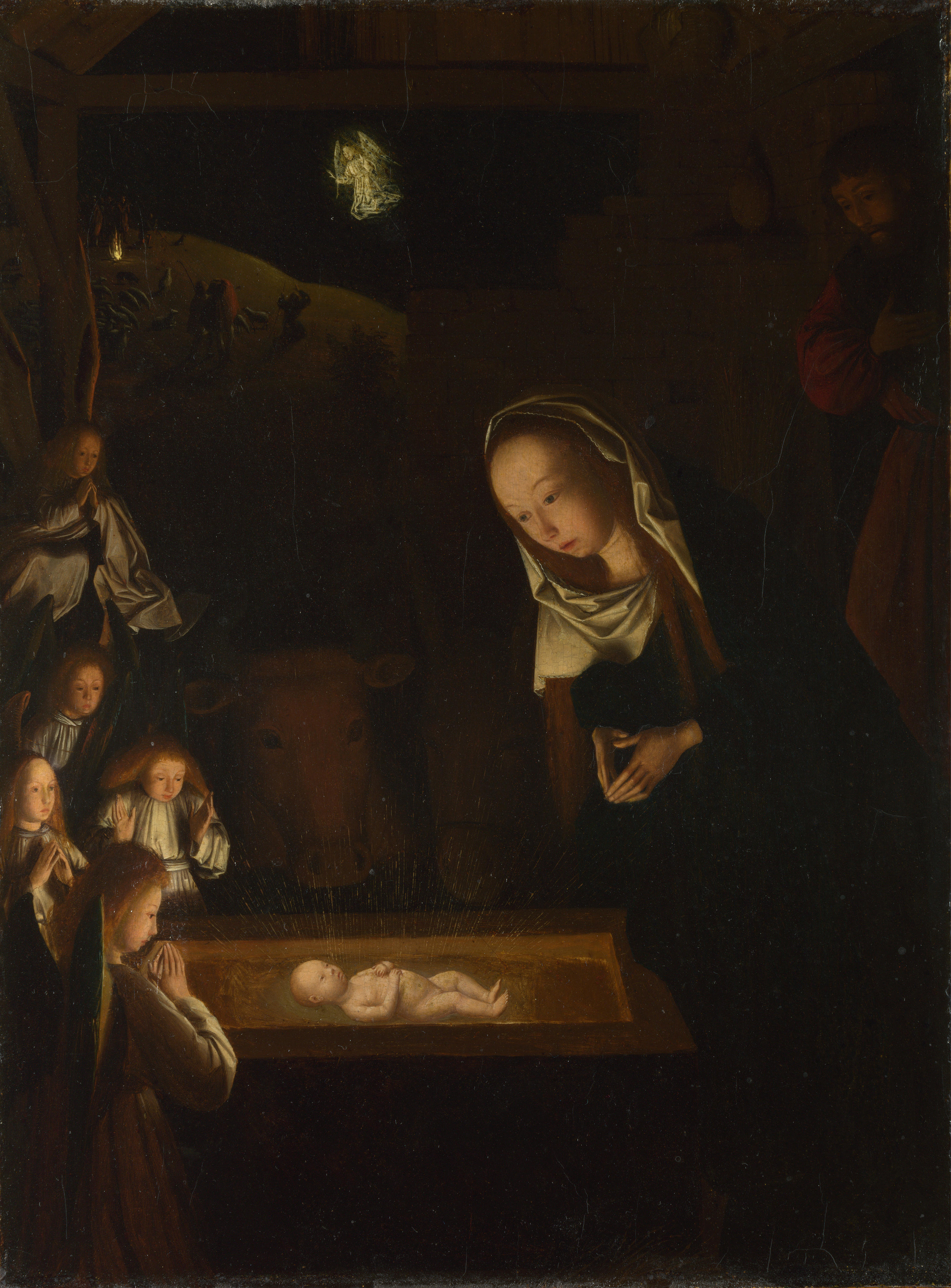
Geertgen depicted the Child Jesus as a light source in his painting Nativity at Night.

According to van Mander, this painting of the Lamentation was originally on the inside right door of a wood-panel triptych for the high altar of the St. John's church in Haarlem, and the two side panels were sawed off from the central panel into two separate paintings after the Protestant Reformation. Both side panels are quite fragile and are located in separate museums today. Modern acceptance of Leiden as Geertgen's birthplace is roughly traceable to Johann Kessler's dissertation of 1930. Geertgen was probably a pupil of Albert van Ouwater. Erwin Panofsky identifies Gerard David as a student of Geertgen tot Sint Jans.

He died, probably still in his twenties, around the year 1495, in Haarlem, where he was buried in the commandry. Modern scholars have attempted to calculate the artist's death date with the information from The Painting-Book (Middle Dutch: Het Schilder-boeck) by Karel van Mander, published in 1604. The reconstruction of Geertgen's active dates has recently been done by Kemperdick and Sander in 2007 stating:

(Geertgen's) two paintings in Vienna indicate a self-assured artist; of the works attributed to Geertgen, they are certainly among the most mature and independent. If the artist was really only twenty-eight when he died, then the altarpiece began at about thirteen years of age and lasted four to six years, so that Geertgen can have ended his training at the earliest by the age of about eighteen. Should he have gone to work for one or two years as a journeyman, then the age at which he began to live by his art correspondingly rises. Accordingly, Geertgen worked a maximum of ten years independently. ...If one now dates the altarpiece for the Knights of St John to around 1490, then Geertgen must, roughly speaking, have been born around 1462/1467 – after the inscription on Matham's engraving in Leiden – and would have begun his apprenticeship around 1475/80.

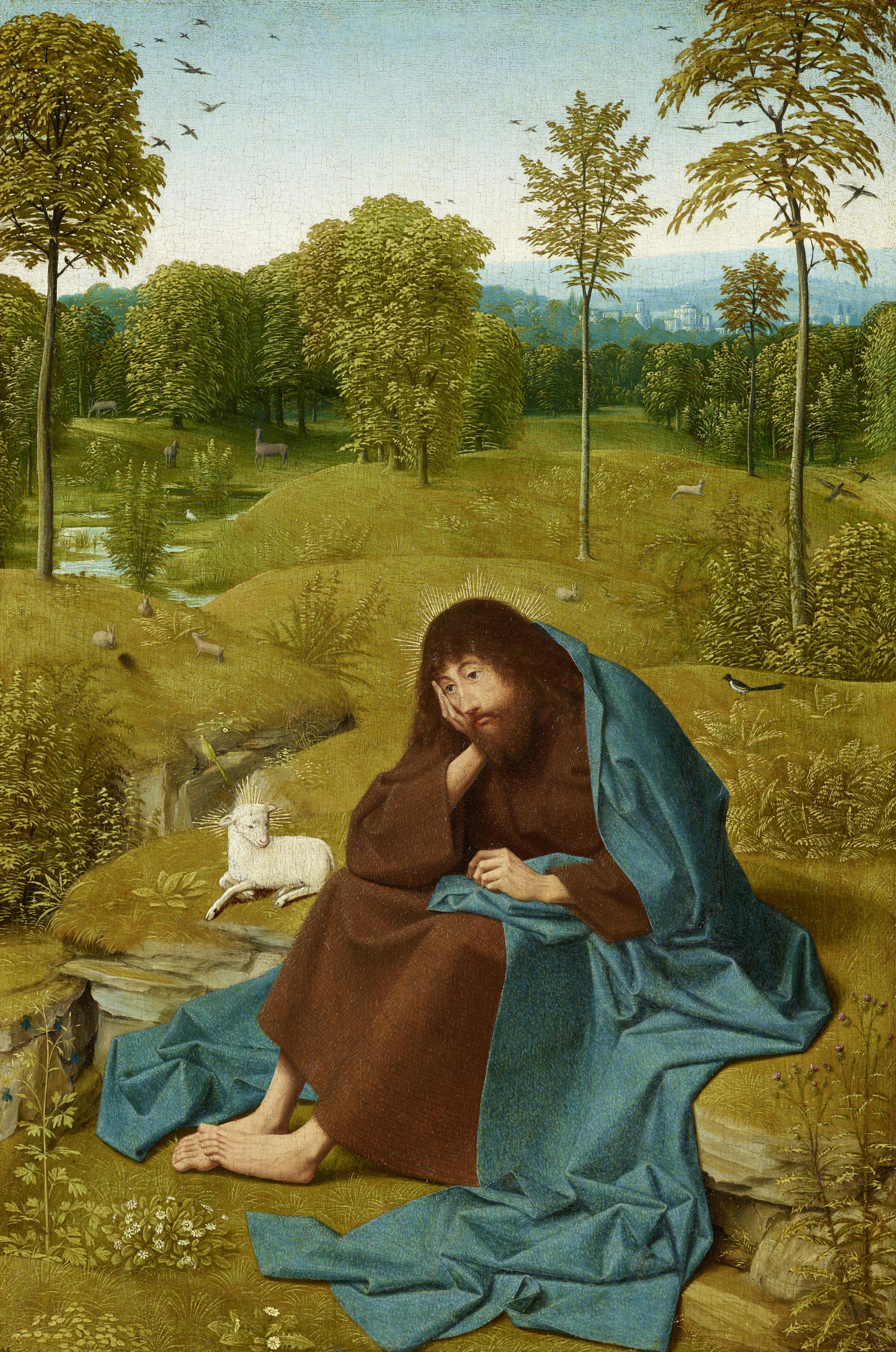
Geertgen's painting John the Baptist in the Wilderness

In the 14th century Haarlem was a major city. It was the second largest city in historical Holland after Dordrecht and before Delft, Leiden, Amsterdam, Gouda and Rotterdam. In 1429 the city gained the right to collect tolls, including ships passing the city on the Spaarne river. At the end of the Middle Ages Haarlem was a flourishing city with a large textile industry, shipyards and beer breweries.

Around 1428 the city was put under siege by the army of Jacqueline, Countess of Hainaut. Haarlem had taken sides with the Cods in the Hook and Cod wars, and thus against Jacoba of Bavaria. The entire Haarlemmerhout wood was burnt down by the enemy. In 1469 the commandry of St. John in Haarlem was promoted to a special status that fell directly under the grand Prior of Germany. Before that it was a subordinate commandry of the Balij of Utrecht, which had 12 commandries reporting to it. The commandry of St. John became quite wealthy from donations by the local families Berkenrode, Assendelft, van Brederode, Tetrode, Schoten, and Adrichem. Schoten was also the location of a St. Lazarus church (currently part of Museum van de Geest) that later came into the possession of the St. Janskerk. Geertgen painted The Lamentation of Christ for the altarpiece of the church of the Knights of Saint John in Haarlem. The painting Lamentation was copied by Jacob Matham in 1620, a mirror image engraving, that includes a Latin poem by Joan Albert Ban, a dedication to Jacob van Campen, and Latin quote by Albrecht Dürer, showing that three men were inspired by this painting. The other side of this altarpiece is showing the burning of the bones of St. John and probably contains a group portrait of the Haarlem members of the order of St. John, with the Commandeur or Precepteur holding the finger of St. John. The St. John's church in Haarlem is where this painting formed the main altarpiece, currently home for the North Holland Archives.

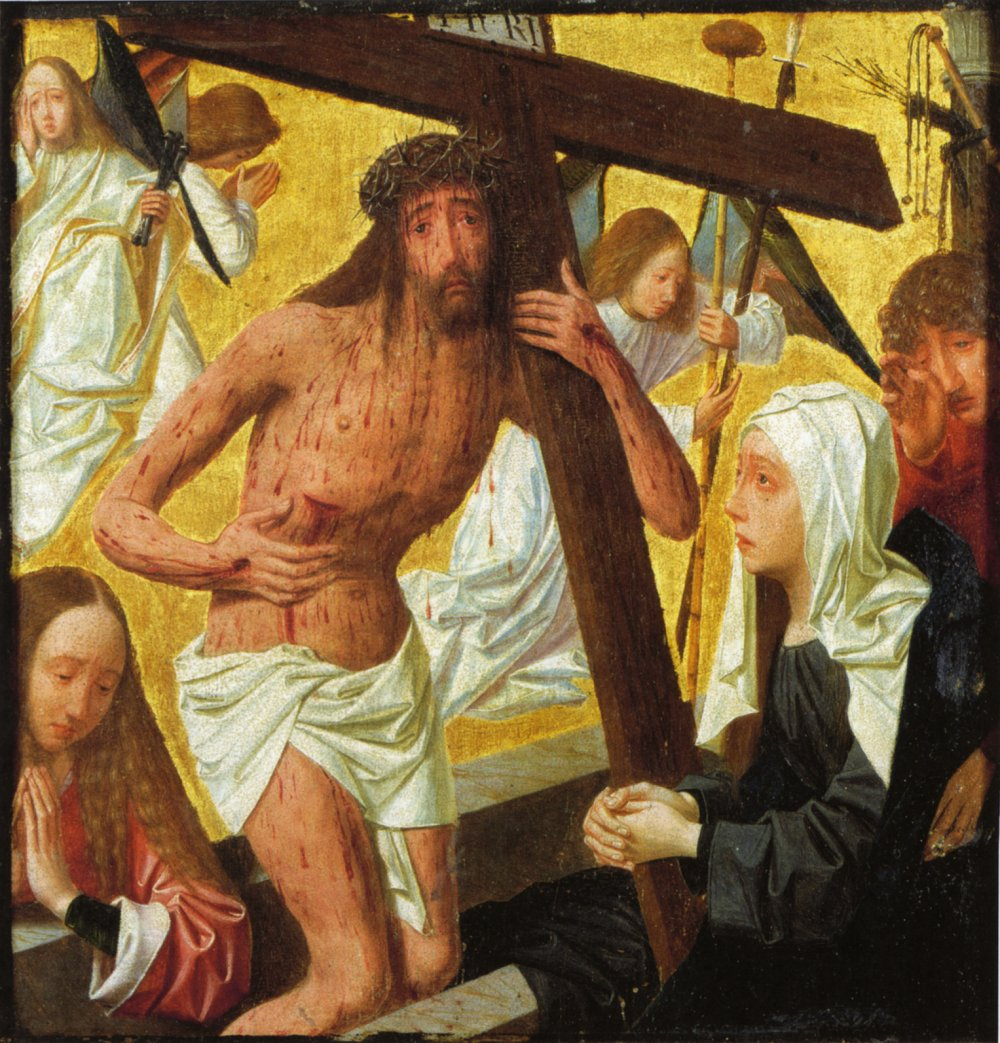
Man of Sorrows c. 1485–95

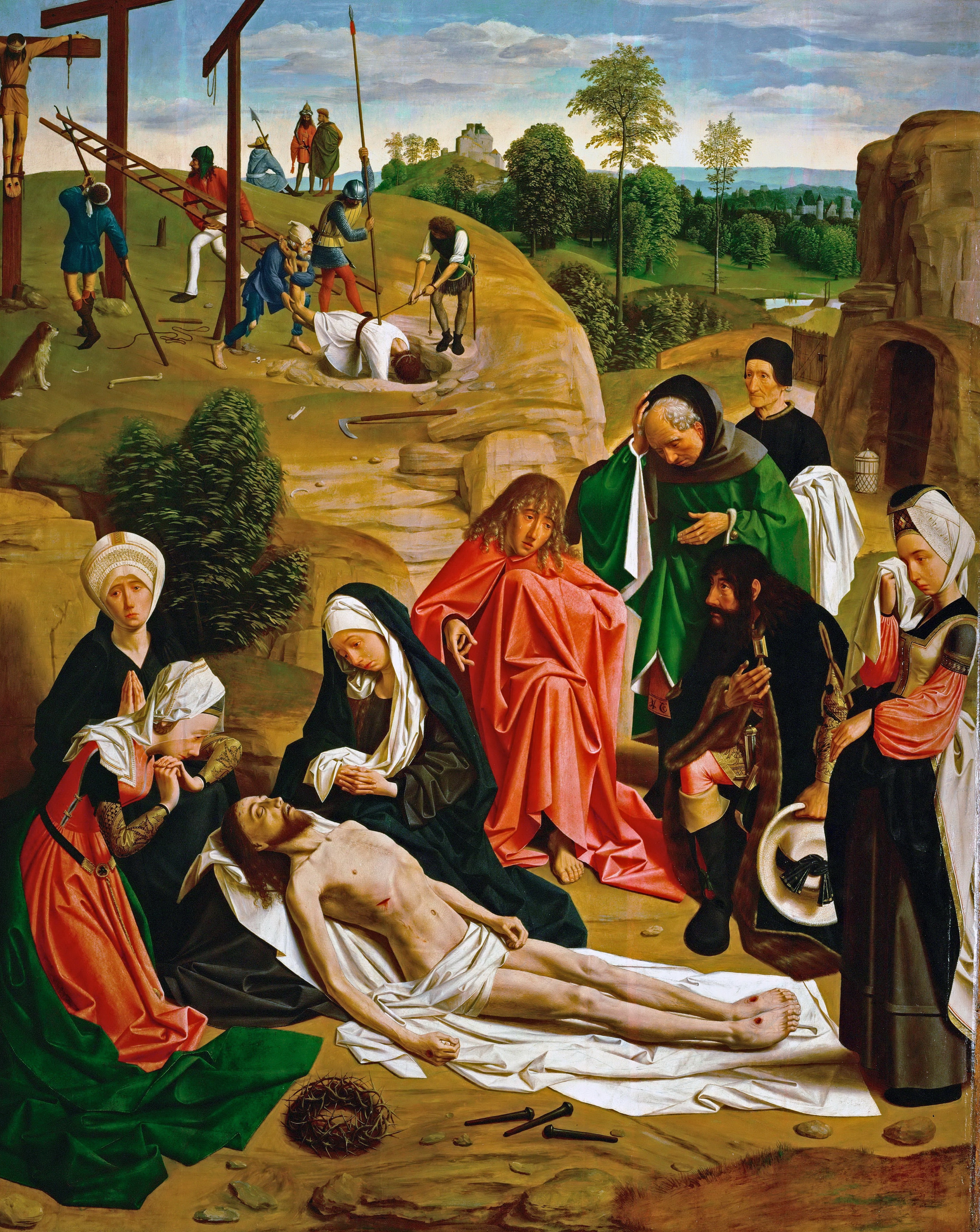
Lamentation of Christ

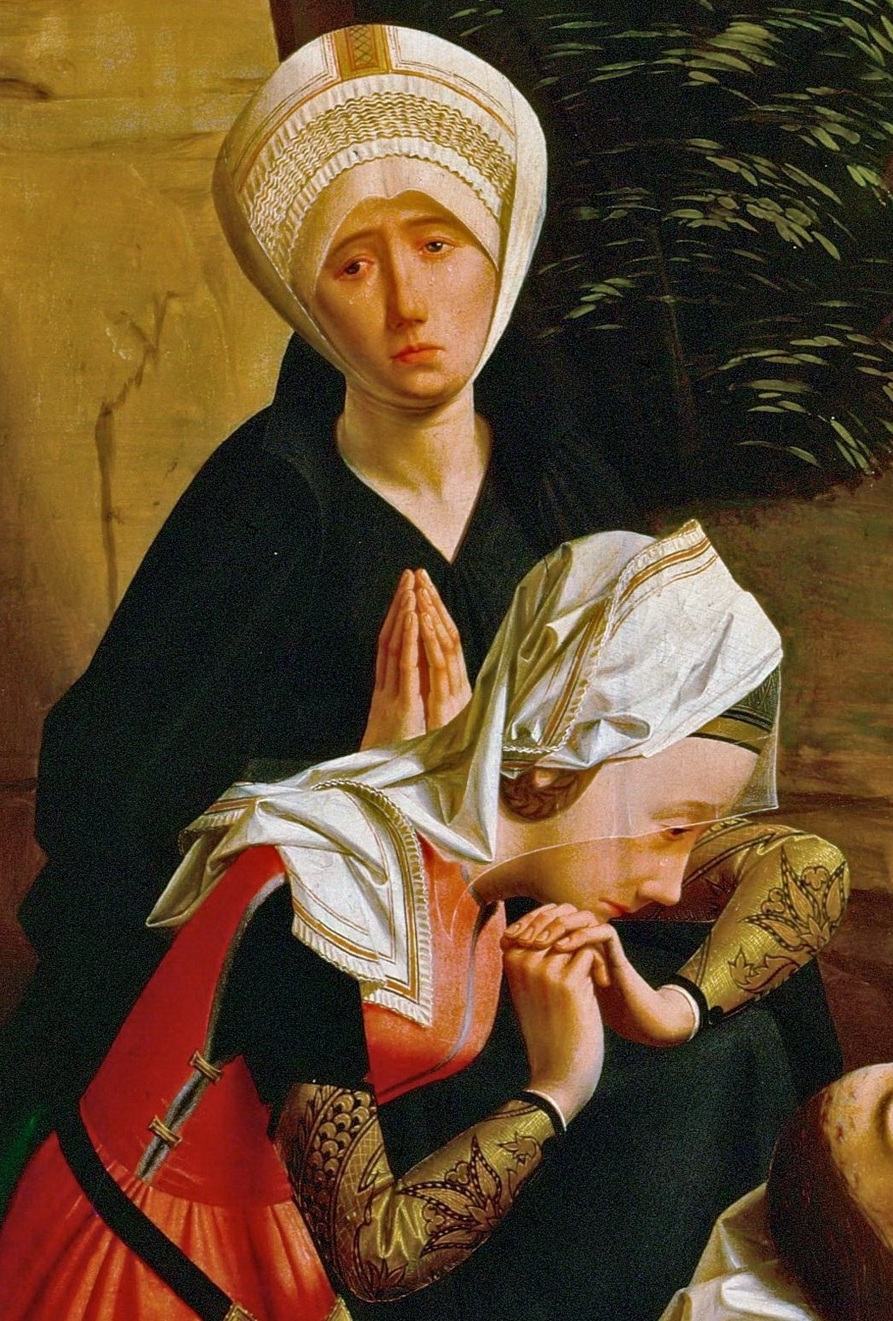
Detail Lamentation

== Painting ==
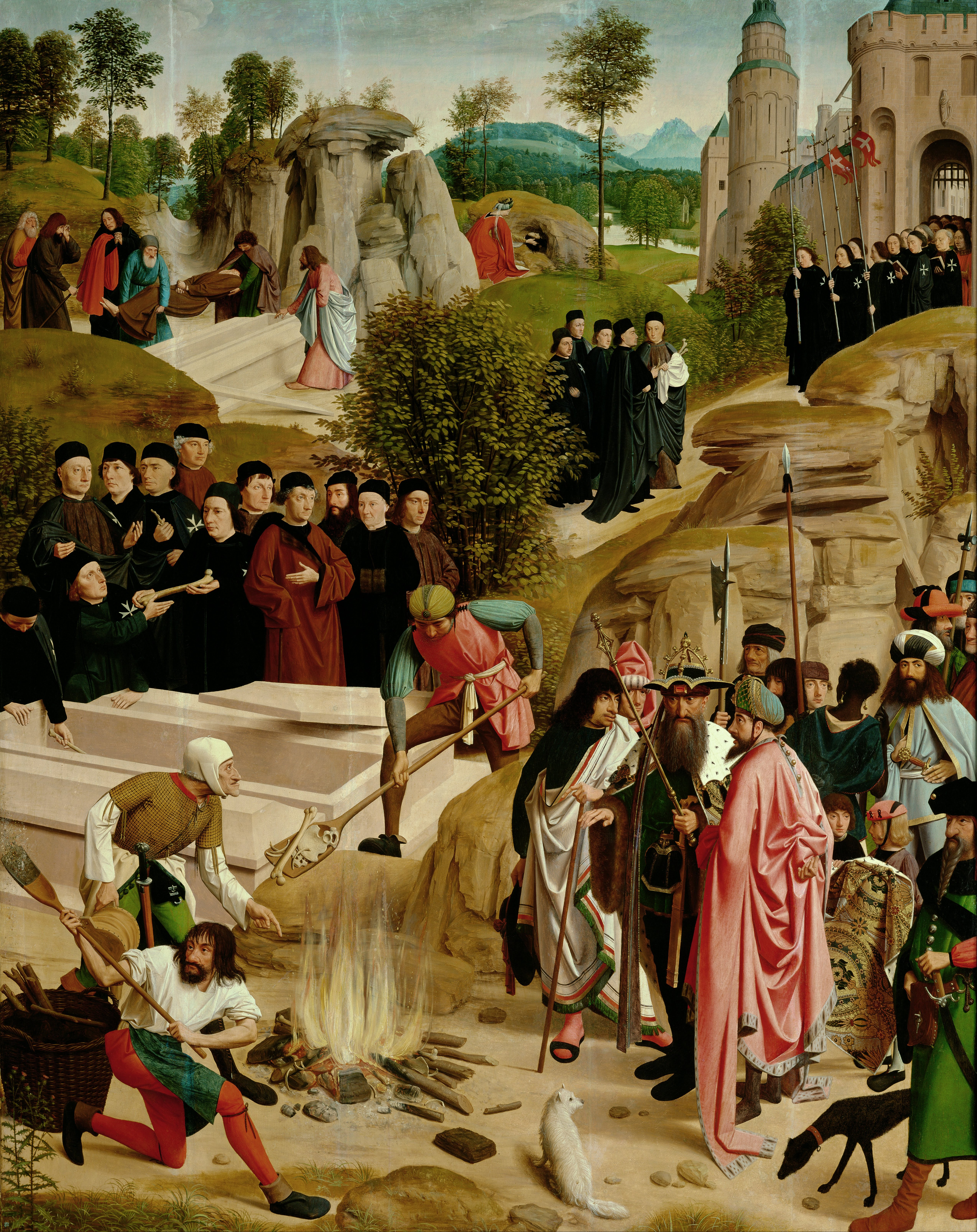
Geertgen tot Sint Jans – The Legend of the Relics of St. John the Baptist

Of the paintings mentioned by Van Mander, the only one to survive is one wing of his triptych for an altar of the Knights of St. John at Haarlem, the two sides of which were sawn apart in about 1600, and are now in Vienna as The Legend of the Relics of St. John the Baptist,^{[i]} and the Lamentation of Jesus. The rest was destroyed during the siege of Haarlem in 1573.

As is typical of the art of the time it was done primarily on oak panels with oil paints made by mixing pigments with drying oil. This allowed the painter to build up layers of paint to provide different visual effects.

The number of works attributed to him (varying between 12 and 16) is under dispute among scholars who discuss the artist (Kessler, Boon, Snyder, Chatelet, Fiero, and Koch).

His paintings are in the collections of the Rijksmuseum in Amsterdam, the Gemäldegalerie in Berlin, the National Gallery, London (Nativity at Night), the Musée du Louvre (The raising of Lazarus) in Paris, Museum Catharijneconvent in Utrecht (Man of Sorrows) and the Kunsthistorisches Museum in Vienna.

== Reception ==
Van Mander states that Albrecht Dürer said of Geertgen "Truly he was a painter in his mother's womb", although Dürer's journal of his Netherlandish travels doesn't mention the painter, and it has been suggested that Van Mander was using a form of epideictic rhetoric to build esteem for a fellow Haarlemmer.^{[ii]}

== Technique ==
Like most painters of his time, he painted with oil paint on wood panels. His paintings depict scenes derived from the New Testament and belong to the early Dutch School. Some of his paintings were destroyed during the Reformation. Around twelve surviving paintings are attributed to him (see below), with others believed to be copies by others of lost originals by him. Painting at that time was a trade to which one entered by apprenticeship at a young age in an established workshop. With modern techniques it is now possible to see some underdrawings that Geertgen made on his panels.

== Portrayal of music ==
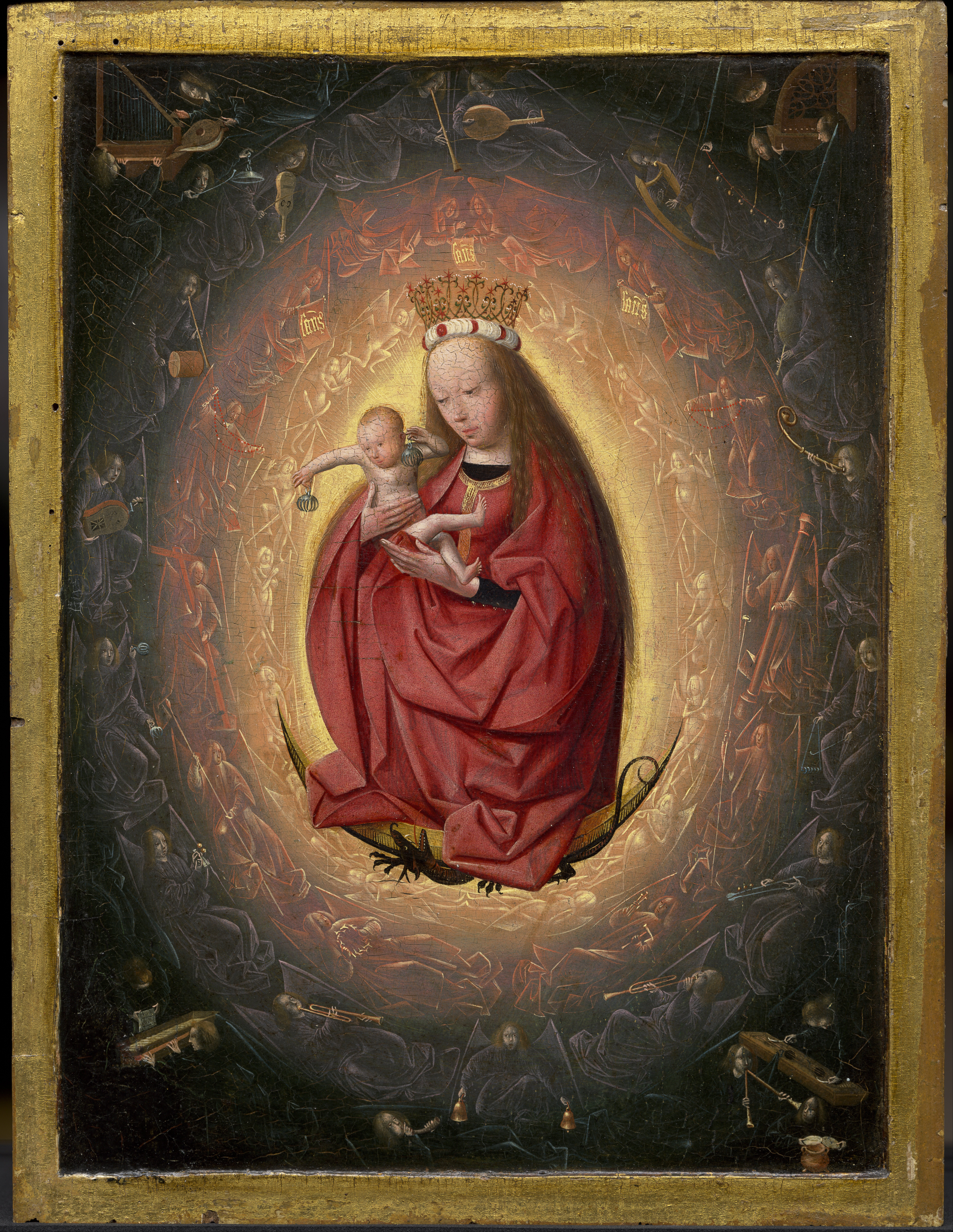
The Glorification of the Virgin (c. 1490–1495)

In his The Glorification of the Virgin, also known as Madonna with Musical Angels and originally part of the so-called Rotterdam-Edinburgh Diptych, the figures of Maria and the infant Jesus are surrounded by three concentric rings which appear to be surrounding a central halo. This "halo" is usually associated with the biblical verse in the Book of Revelation referring to the woman clothed in the Sun, interpreted as representing the Madonna in heaven.

The original diptych was first presented with a left panel of identical size usually referred to as Geertgen's Passion of Christ. Within the concentric rings of the halo in the Madonna with Musical Angels panel are found a variety of musical instruments. This painting shows some of the oldest pictures of musical instruments known in the Netherlands (c.1480–1490). In the central depiction of the infant Jesus with the Madonna, the infant Jesus is depicted as playing a pair of bells, and seems to be playing music as if in response to one of the angels in the outermost concentric ring, holding an identical set of bells and looking directly back at the infant Jesus.

== List of works ==
- The raising of Lazarus (1480s)
- St Bavo with falcon (c. 1490)
- The Lamentation of Christ (after 1484)
- The Holy Kinship (c. 1485–1496)
- The Adoration of the Magi (c. 1480–1485)
- Adoration of the Kings (c. 1485)
- St Bavo with Donor – the left side of the Adoration of the Kings from ca. 1485
- St. Hadrian with Donor – the right side of the Adoration of the Kings from ca. 1485
- Madonna and child (c. 1490)
- John the Baptist in the Wilderness (c. 1490)
- The Glorification of the Virgin (c. 1490–1495), also named Virgin and Child
- Nativity at Night (c. 1490?)

== Notes ==
- ^{i} The title is Geschiedenis van het gebeente (beenderen) van Johannes de Doper in Dutch.
- ^{ii} For more information on Karel van Mander's "nationalistic" project, see Walter Melion's Shaping the Netherlandish Canon.
