= Man of Sorrows (Geertgen tot Sint Jans) =

Painting by Geertgen tot Sint Jans

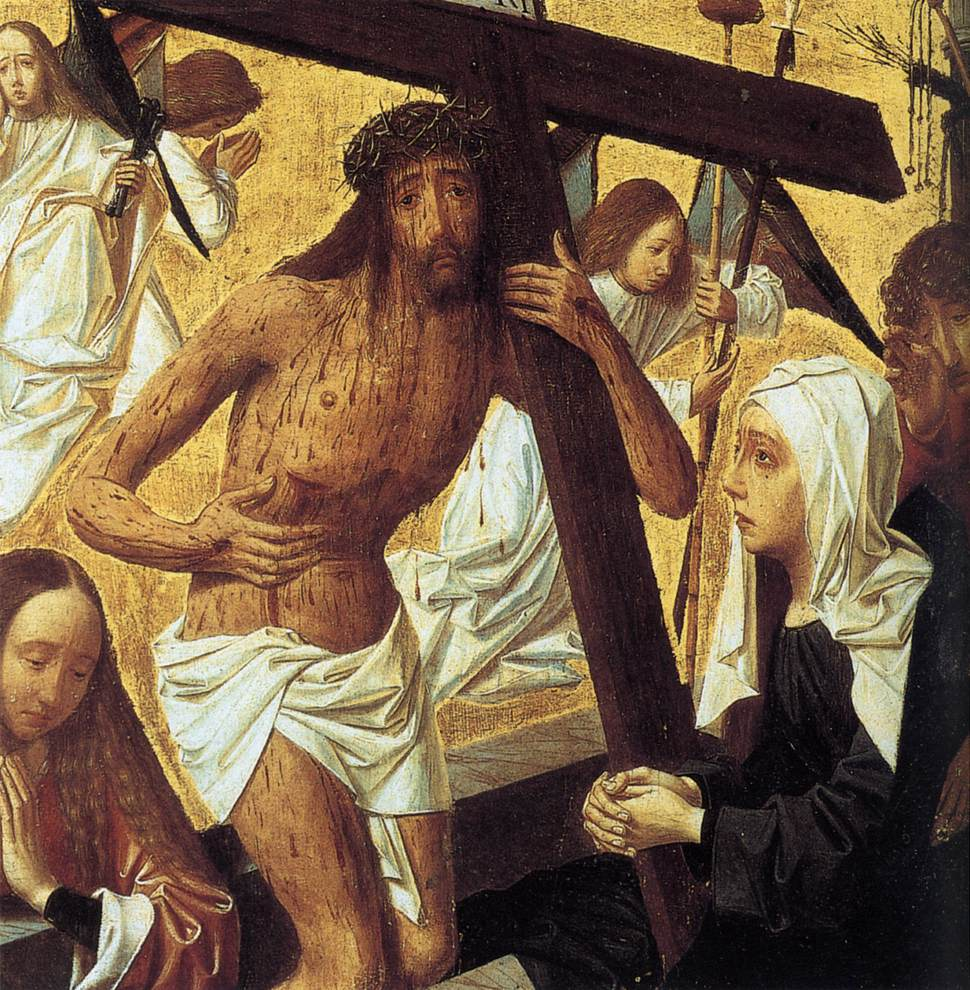
- Artist: Geertgen tot Sint Jans
- Year: c. 1485-1495
- Medium: oil on wood panel
- Dimensions: 34.5 cm × 24 cm (13.6 in × 9.4 in)
- Location: Museum Catharijneconvent, Utrecht

Man of Sorrows is a small Early Netherlandish oil on wood panel painting completed c. 1485–1495. It is attributed to Geertgen tot Sint Jans and in the tradition of the devotional images of the "Man of Sorrows", which typically show Christ before his crucifixion, naked above the waist, bearing the wounds of his Passion. The panel has an unusually complex and suffocating spatial design, and depicts the mocking of Jesus, and his grieving mother. The panel is steeped in both complex iconography and deep pathos. Christ is in obvious pain and holds his wounds up for the viewer. He looks out while white robed weeping angels bear the Arma Christi -objects associated with his crucifixion and death- float around him. The attending saints include Mary and the Magdalene.

Man of Sorrows has been described as "one of the most moving ... in Early Netherlandish art", and is usually considered a highly emotive and sorrowful work, especially in its description of Christ's pitiful, almost defeated expression and blood-run face. Nothing is known about the lost right hand panel; it may have contained another religious scene or a donor portrait. It is housed in the Museum Catharijneconvent, Utrecht.

== Devotional type ==
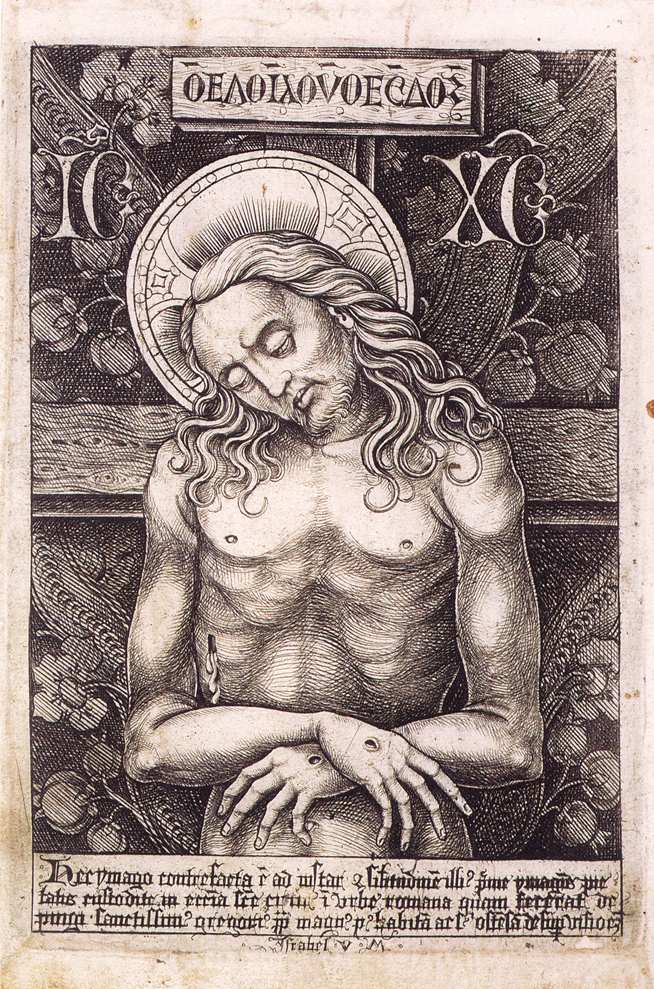
Israhel van Meckenem the Younger, Vera icon, engraving, c. 1490. Staatliche Museen, Berlin

The panel is in the tradition of the iconic devotional image of the "Man of Sorrows", which developed in Europe from the 13th century, and was especially popular in Northern Europe. The phrase, in the passages of Isaiah 53 (Servant songs) in the Hebrew Bible, translates into English as "Man of Sorrows" ("vir dolorum" in the Vulgate):

3) He is despised and rejected of men, a Man of sorrows, and acquainted with grief. And we hid as it were our faces from Him; He was despised, and we esteemed Him not.

4) Surely He hath borne our griefs and carried our sorrows; yet we did esteem Him stricken, smitten of God, and afflicted.

5) But He was wounded for our transgressions; He was bruised for our iniquities. The chastisement of our peace was upon Him, and with His stripes we are healed.

6) All we like sheep have gone astray; we have turned every one to his own way; and the Lord hath laid on Him the iniquity of us all.

In such works the viewer is asked to stand before the wounded and maimed, half naked body of Christ, and contemplate and contemplate and take responsibility for his sufferings. Geertgen's depiction differs from previous iconographical depictions in that Christ's head is raised, and he looks directly at the viewer.

== Description ==
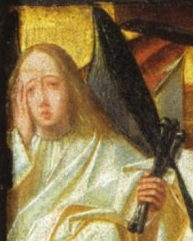
Detail with angel overcome by grief

Christ stands in his tomb, a stone sarcophagus. His entire body is lacerated and deformed by wounds sustained during his flogging. Yet he not clearly dead, as in earlier depictions. His eyes stare directly at the viewer, a device identified by the art historian Erwin Panofsky as referring to the biblical text "Behold what I have suffered for you; what have you suffered for me". The gesture was earlier identified by art historian Alois Riegl as evoking an "external unity" where Christ's gaze becomes one with the viewer's world. Art historian Wouter Slob writes that Christ's expression "confronts the contemporary viewer with the consequences of His sinning; the blood, splashing from the panel, flows because of his guilt." Despite Christ's apparent agony, his animated, half-standing, half-kneeling pose in his sarcophagus seems to reference his Resurrection. He may be equally descending into or our the tomb.

To his left, Mary Magdalene kneels in prayer. Her arms rest on the sarcophagus, her eyes are downcast, her plaintive expression is a study of grief. At the foot of the cross, Jesus' mother, Mary, laments with arms folded, as large drops of tears pour down her face. She is supported by John the Evangelist with only his head and hands visible, wiping his tears with the back of his hand. Angels dressed in white robes, their eyes swollen with tears, carry the remaining Arma Christi, including the lance, Holy Sponge and the three nails from the cross.

== Iconography ==
=== Mourners ===
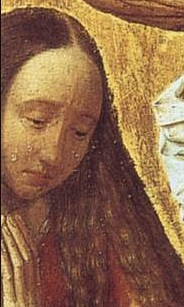
Detail of Mary Magdalene

A number of saints and angels are openly weeping, imbuing the Passion with very human qualities, and expressive of emotional turmoil. Probably the employment of tears is reflective of Geertgen's tendency towards emotionalism, but may also have been to intended to invoke contrition, forcing the viewer to view Christ's sufferings individual terms, and reflect on their own culpability. Church theology of the time encouraged compassion for Christ's suffering, while emphasising that mankind was the source of his torments. According to art historian John Decker, medieval "sermons and devotional tracts encouraged the faithful to study the broken body of Christ, to tally his wounds, and to bear always in mind that humankind's various sins caused each injury." The scene allowed viewers "opportunities to interact empathetically with sacred history"; and encouraged contrition and penitence, an approach reflected in works by Rogier van der Weyden, later adopted by Geertgen.

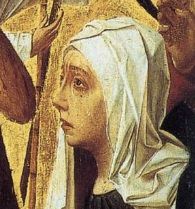
Detail showing Mary, mother of Jesus, with a tear on her cheek

The use of tears to denote grief was probably derived from Rogier, who fascinated by tears, refined a subtle formula for the depiction of crying, as can be seen especially his Madrid Descent from the Cross of c. 1435. Mary has a large tear pouring down her cheek, which art historian Moshe Barasch describes as "painted with subtle shadows to give it material substance, with reflections and a highlight to make it transparent and shiny", and compares its rendering to that of jewelry or glass.

In some instances the tears are implied by a hand gesture rather than actually shown. This is again influenced by Rogier's Descent, but originates from Campin's Entombment, where a figure is implied to be crying by the fact that he wipes his face with the back of his hand, a technique Rogier borrowed and perfected some 20 years later.

=== Crucifixion ===
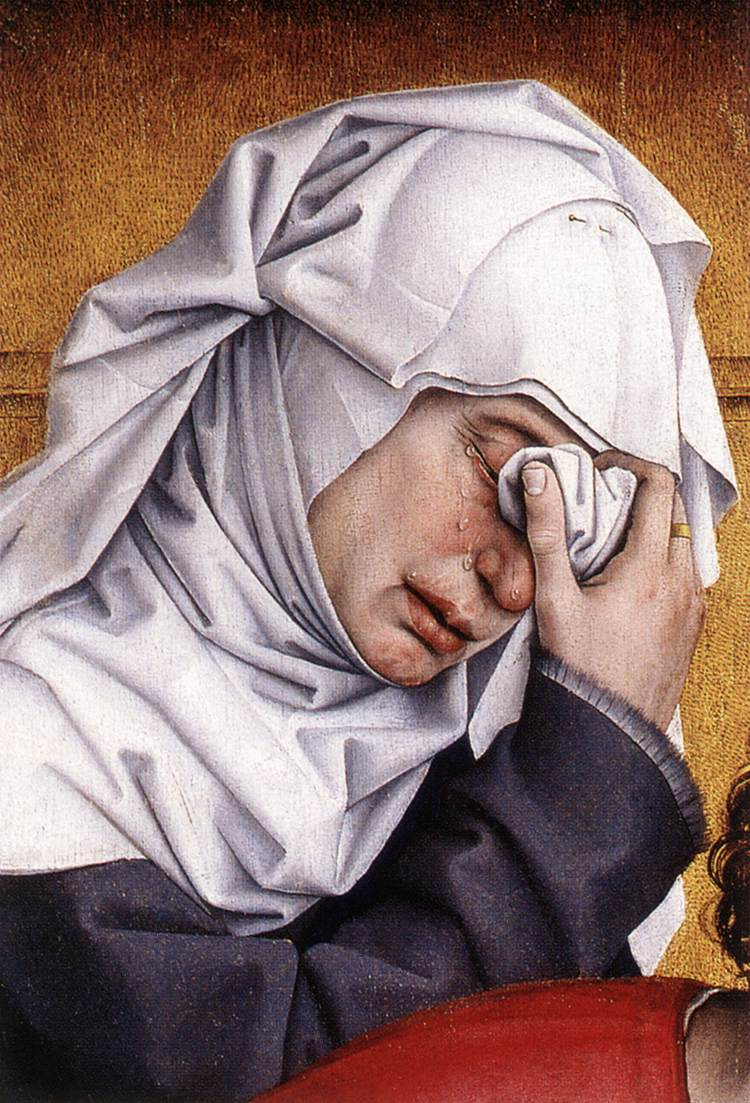
Detail from Rogier van der Weyden's Descent from the Cross, c. 1435. Here van der Weyden portrays the tears and partially visible eyes of Mary of Clopas.

The panel shows Christs tortured body at his resting place on Calvary, still carrying the torment of his wooden cross, his knees buckling from its weight. The painting contains many symbols of his Passion. He wears the Crown of Thorns; its spikes spill blood across his face. His arms are heavily lacerated by what appear to be whip marks, and he weakly raises his right hand to display the deep wound to his side, where according to scripture, he was pierced by a lance after his death on the cross. In 1927, Panofsky identified the panel in the tradition of iconic devotional depictions (andachtsbilder) of the "Man of Sorrows", noting especially its focus on the sacrificial aspect of the Passion and its unflinching, yet emotive depiction of physical suffering.

In some respects the work is unsophisticated; composed mainly from simplified geometric forms, while there is not much differentiation in the oval, idealised faces of the female figures. The clothes of any of the figures are not especially detailed; their volume and texture only suggested by the heavy folds. However, it is highly regarded for its complex and innovative composition, with many of the elements presented at oblique angles. It is very tightly cropped, for the era it was produced, cutting off the Magdalene and Evangelist would have been considered daring.

== Attribution ==
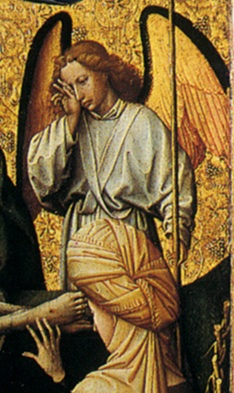
Robert Campin, Entombment, c. 1410–15. Courtauld Institute of Art, London

The work is attributed to Geertgen tot Sint Jans mainly for its typically simplified geometric shapes, and similarity to his The Lamentation of Christ; a painting in which the faces and expressions of Mary and John bear striking similarity to the present work. The attribution was accepted by both Friedländer and Panofsky. Especially Panofsky was enthusiastic about the panel, but Friedländer did not hold it in high regard. He praised the description of the Virgin, especially her face and hands, and described the depiction of the Magdalene as "realistic...with such carefully observed shadows" and "among the masters best work". However he found the figure of Christ to be "traditional", and wrote that the "absence of spatial elaboration overall is felt to be all the more vexing". Overall the image, he believed, lacked depth of field and compositional balance.

Panofsky, although he generally admired Friedländer's analysis, disagreed strongly, and in a 1927 treatise on Netherlandish depictions of the "Man of Sorrows" wrote, "As, however, all the seemingly haphazard composition lines lead with compelling force to the face of the Savior, which, lifted out of the image, focuses its large, tearful eye on us, the sum of all the sorrows which he suffers, and all of the mourning that is suffered for him, now appears to besiege us."

== Provenance ==
Nothing is recorded of the panel's commission or early owners. Given the remnants of hinges on its frame, the work probably formed the left hand side of a diptych of which the opposite panel is now lost, possibly split up during the 18th century when composite works of this era were out of fashion and were broken up to be sold as individual easel pictures. The Man of Sorrows is thought to have been created as part of a series of small paintings for the Haarlem Commandery of the Knights of St John, a group of works that explore a range of human emotions. That group of paintings originally hung in the organisation's Church of St. John in Haarlem.

== Sources ==
- Barasch, Moshe. "The Crying Face". Artibus et Historiae, Volume 8, No. 15, 1987
- Campbell, Lorne. Van der Weyden. London: Chaucer Press, 2004. ISBN 1-904449-24-7
- Decker, John. "Engendering Contrition, Wounding the Soul: Geertgen Tot Sint Jans' 'Man of Sorrows'" Artibus et Historiae, Volume 29, No. 57, 2008
- Devonshire Jones, Tom; Rosen, Aaron. The Oxford Dictionary of Christian Art and Architecture. Oxford: Oxford University Press, 2013. ISBN 978-0-1996-8027-6
- Friedländer, Max J. Early Netherlandish Painting. Translated by Heinz Norden. Leiden: Praeger, 1967–76. ASIN B0006BQGOW
- Panofsky, Erwin. Early Netherlandish Painting. London: HarperCollins, 1953. ISBN 0-06-430002-1
- Ridderbos, Bernhard; Van Buren, Anne; Van Veen, Henk. Early Netherlandish Paintings: Rediscovery, Reception and Research. Amsterdam: Amsterdam University Press, 2005. ISBN 0-89236-816-0
- Slob, Wouter. "Dialogical Rhetoric: An Essay on Truth and Normativity After Postmodernism". Springer, 2002. ISBN 1-4020-0909-7
- Smith, Jeffrey Chipps. The Northern Renaissance (Art and Ideas). London: Phaidon Press, 2004. ISBN 0-7148-3867-5
- Snyder, James. "The Early Haarlem School of Painting: II. Geertgen Tot Sint Jans". The Art Bulletin, volume 42, Number 2, June 1960. pp. 113–132. JSTOR 3047890
