= St. Nicholas Church =

The following cathedrals, churches and chapels are dedicated to Saint Nicholas:

== Albania ==
- St. Nicholas Church, Kurjan
- St. Nicholas Church, Moscopole
- St. Nicholas Church, Perondi
- St. Nicholas Church, Shelcan

== Australia ==
- St Nicholas Russian Orthodox Cathedral, Brisbane, Queensland
- St Nicholas Serbian Orthodox Church, Geelong, Victoria

== Austria ==
- Church of St. Nikolaus, Lockenhaus
- Feldkirch Cathedral
- St. Nicholas Church, Inzersdorf, Vienna

== Azerbaijan ==
- Church of Saint Nicholas the Wonderworker, Sabirabad
- St. Nicholas Church, Baku

== Belarus ==
- Church of Saint Nicholas, Svir

== Belgium ==
- Church of St. Nicholas, Brussels
- Saint Nicholas Church, Ghent

== Bulgaria ==
- Church of St Nicholas, Sapareva Banya
- Church of St. Nicholas, Sofia
- Church of St Nicholas, Vukovo
- Russian Church, Sofia

== Canada ==
- St. Nicholas Macedonian Orthodox Church (Windsor, Ontario)

== China ==
- Saint Nicholas Cathedral, Harbin
- Saint Nicholas' Church, Shanghai

== Croatia ==
- Church of St. Nicholas, Rijeka

== Cyprus ==
- Saint Nicolas Cathedral, Famagusta, now Lala Mustafa Pasha Mosque

== Czech Republic ==
- Cathedral of St Nicholas, České Budějovice
- St. Nicholas Church (Malá Strana), Prague
- St. Nicholas Church (Staré Město), Prague
- St. Nicholas Church, Louny
- St. Nicholas Church (Vršovice)

== Denmark ==
- St. Nicholas Church, Aarhus
- St. Nicolai Church, Vejle

== Estonia ==
- Haapsalu Castle and cathedral
- St. Nicholas Church, Tallinn
- St. Nicholas Orthodox Church, Tallinn

== Finland ==
- St. Nicholas Church, former name of Helsinki Cathedral
- Saint Nicholas Church, Ingå
- St. Nicholas Church, Kotka
- Saint Nicholas Cathedral, Kuopio

== France ==
- Saint Nicholas Chapel, on the Pont Saint-Bénézet, Avignon
- Saint-Nicolas-du-Chardonnet, Paris
- Saint Nicolas Church, Toulouse
- Saint Nicholas Church, Strasbourg
- Russian Orthodox Cathedral, Nice

== Germany ==
- St. Nicholas Church, Berlin
- Old St. Nicholas Church, Frankfurt
- St. Nikolai, Greifswald
- St. Nicholas Church, Hamburg
- St. Nikolai, Kiel
- Steindamm Church, Königsberg
- St. Nicholas Church, Leipzig
- St. Nicolai, Lüneburg
- St. Nicholas Church, Potsdam
- Schelf Church, Schwerin
- St. Nicholas Church, Stendal
- St. Nicholas Church, Stralsund
- St. Nicholas Church, Wismar

== Greece ==
- Church of St. Nicholas Orphanos, Thessaloniki

== Hungary ==
- Church of Saint Nicholas, Szeged
- Church of Saint Nicholas, Eger

== Iran ==
- St. Nicholas Church, Tehran

== Ireland ==
- Church of St Nicholas Without, Dublin
- Church of St. Nicholas Within, Dublin
- Church of St Nicholas of Myra Without, (Roman Catholic), Dublin
- St. Nicholas' Collegiate Church, Galway
- Cathedral of Our Lady Assumed into Heaven and St Nicholas, Galway

== Israel ==
- Saint Nicholas Monastery, Jaffa

== Italy ==
- Basilica of Saint Nicholas, Bari
- Russian Orthodox Church of Saint Nicholas, Bari
- Church of the Nativity of Christ and St. Nicholas (Florence)
- St. Nicholas' Church, Merano
- San Nicola alla Carità, Naples
- San Nicola, Ottana
- Palmi Cathedral (Chiesa di San Nicola), Palmi
- San Nicola, Pisa
- San Nicola da Tolentino agli Orti Sallustiani, Rome
- San Nicola in Carcere, Rome
- Sassari Cathedral
- Monastery of San Nicolò al Lido, Venice
- San Nicolò dei Mendicoli, Venice

== Kosovo ==
- Saint Nicholas's Church (Drajčići)
- Saint Nicholas's Church (Mušnikovo)
- Church of St. Nicholas, Prizren
- Church of St. Nicholas, Janjevo

== Latvia ==
- St. Nicholas Naval Cathedral, Karosta

== Lithuania ==
- St. Nicholas Church, Semeliškės
- Church of St. Nicholas, Telšiai
- Church of Saint Nicholas, Vilnius
- Church of Saint Nicholas, Kaunas

== Malta ==
- St Nicholas' Chapel, Għargħur
- Chapel of St Nicholas, Fort Ricasoli
- St Nicholas Chapel, Mdina
- St Nicholas and St Lucy Chapel, Rabat
- Church of St Nicholas, Siġġiewi
- Church of St Nicholas, Valletta
- Chapel of St Nicholas, Żejtun
- Chapel of St Nicholas, Żonqor

== Monaco ==
- Saint Nicholas Cathedral, Monaco

== Montenegro ==
- Church of St. Nicholas, Kotor
- St Nicholas Church - Perast, Catholic
- St Nicholas church at Praskvica Monastery, near Sveti Stefan, Serbian Orthodox
- Church of St Nicholas - Sveti Nikola Island (Budva), Catholic
- St Nicholas Church - Gornji Stoliv, Catholic

== Netherlands ==
- Basilica of Saint Nicholas, Amsterdam
- Ons' Lieve Heer op Solder
- Oude Kerk, Amsterdam or St. Nicholas Church, Amsterdam
- Sint-Nicolaaskerk (Dwingeloo), Dwingelo
- Sint-Nicolaaskerk (Purmerend), Purmerend
- Sint-Nicolaaskerk (Meijel), Meijel
- Sint-Nicolaaskerk (Purmerend), Valkenswaard

== North Macedonia ==
- Church of St. Nicholas, Kumanovo
- St Nicholas Church, Mavrovo

== Norway ==
- Eidsborg Stave Church

== Poland ==
- St. Nicholas' Church, Bączal Dolny
- Orthodox Cathedral of St. Nicholas, Białystok
- Cathedral of St. Nicholas, Bielsko-Biała
- St. Nicholas' Church, Brzeg
- Bydgoszcz Cathedral
- Saint Nicholas Church, Bydgoszcz
- Rotunda of Saint Nicolas in Cieszyn
- Church of St. Nicholas, Dratów
- St. Nicholas Cathedral, Elbląg
- Basilica of St. Nicholas, Gdańsk
- Cathedral of St. Nicholas the Bishop in Kalisz
- Łowicz Cathedral
- St. Nicholas Church, Owińska
- Church of St. Nicholas, Tomaszów Lubelski
- Church of Saint Nicholas, Trzęsacz
- Church of St. Nicholas, Włocławek (1906–1925)
- St. Nicholas Church, Wszembórz
- St. Nicholas Church, Wysocice
- Church of St. Nicholas, Zabłocie

== Portugal ==
- Church of Saint Nicholas, Lisbon
- Church of Saint Nicholas, Porto
- Church of Saint Nicholas, Santarém
- Church of Saint Nicholas, Sete Cidades

== Romania ==
- St. Nicholas Church, Brașov
- St. Nicholas Church, Brăila
- Bucharest Russian Church
- Budești Josani church
- St. Nicholas Church, Făgăraș
- New St. Nicholas Church, Focșani
- Old St. Nicholas Church, Focșani
- Stroe Church, Focșani
- Tăbăcari Church, Focșani
- Saint Nicholas Princely Church, Iași
- St. Nicholas Cathedral, Oradea
- St. Nicholas Church, Orlat
- Cathedral of Saint Nicholas, Râmnicu Vâlcea, the seat of the archdiocese of Râmnic
- St. Nicholas Church, Râșnov
- St. Nicholas Cathedral, Tulcea
- St. Nicholas Church, Zărnești
- Church of Saint Nicholas, Timisoara

== Russia ==
- Juditten Church, Kaliningrad
- Church of St. Nicholas in Khamovniki, Moscow
- Church of St. Nicholas in Tolmachi, Moscow
- St. Nicholas Church (Buzhaninovo)
- Saint Nicholas Cathedral, Novgorod
- Saint Nicholas Chapel, Novosibirsk
- Kronstadt Naval Cathedral, Saint Petersburg
- St. Nicholas Naval Cathedral, Saint Petersburg
- St. Nicholas Church, Taganrog

== Serbia ==
- Monastery of Saint Nicholas, Kuršumlija
- St. Nicholas Cathedral, Ruski Krstur
- Saint Nicholas Cathedral, Sremski Karlovci

== Slovakia ==
- Church of Saint-Nicolas of Bodružal
- St. Nicholas Church, Bratislava
- Co-Cathedral of Saint Nicholas, Prešov
- Church of Saint Nicolas of Ruská Bystrá
- St Nicholas Church, Stará Ľubovňa
- Saint Nicolas Church, Trnava

== Slovenia ==
- Ljubljana Cathedral
- Murska Sobota Cathedral
- Novo Mesto Cathedral

== Spain ==
- Concatedral de San Nicolás, Alicante
- St Nicholas' Church, Madrid
- St Nicholas' Church, Pamplona
- San Nicolás, Valencia

== Sweden ==
- St. Nicholas Church, Halmstad
- St. Nicholas Church, Örebro
- Storkyrkan, Stockholm

== Switzerland ==
- Fribourg Cathedral
- Saint-Nicolas Church, Hérémence

== Tajikistan ==
- St. Nicholas Cathedral (Dushanbe)

== Turkey ==
- St. Nicholas Church, Demre

== Ukraine ==
- Saint Nicholas Church, Dnipro
- St. Nicholas Military Cathedral (demolished), Kyiv
- St. Nicholas Roman Catholic Church, Kyiv
- Kryvka Church, Lviv
- St. Nicholas Cathedral, Nizhyn
- St. Nicholas Church, Sopych
- Church of St Nicholas on Askold's Grave

== United Kingdom ==
=== England ===
==== Berkshire ====
- St Nicolas Church, Newbury

==== Bristol ====
- St Nicholas Church, Bristol

==== Buckinghamshire ====
- St Nicholas Church, Ickford

==== Cambridgeshire ====
- St Nicholas Church, Kennett

==== Cheshire ====
- St Nicholas Chapel, Chester
- St Nicholas Chapel, Cholmondeley
- St Nicholas Church, Burton

==== City of London ====
- St Nicholas Cole Abbey

==== County Durham ====
- St Nicholas Church, Durham

==== Dorset ====
- St Nicholas's Church, Kimmeridge

==== East Sussex ====
- St Nicholas Church, Brighton
- St Nicholas Church, Iford
- St Nicolas Church, Pevensey
- St Nicolas Church, Portslade, Brighton and Hove
- Hastings Fishermen's Museum, Hastings ("The Fishermen's Church")

==== Essex ====
- St Nicholas' Church, Berden
- St Nicholas Church, Kelvedon Hatch

==== Gloucestershire ====
- St Nicholas Church, Gloucester
- St Nicholas Church, Hardwicke
- St Nicholas of Myra's Church, Ozleworth

==== Greater London ====
- St Nicholas Church, Chislehusrt; see Chislehurst
- St Nicholas Church, Chiswick, London
- St Nicholas Church, Deptford
- St Nicholas Church, Sutton, London
- St Nicholas, Tooting Graveney

==== Hampshire ====
- St Nicolas Church, North Stoneham
- St Nicholas Church, Freefolk

==== Hertfordshire ====
- St Nicholas Church, Harpenden
- St Nicholas' Church, Stevenage

==== Isle of Wight ====
- Church of St Nicholas in Castro, Carisbrooke

==== Kent ====
- St Nicholas Church, Linton
- St Nicholas Church, New Romney
- St Nicholas Church, Rochester
- St. Nicholas, Strood

==== Lancashire ====
- St Nicholas Church, Fleetwood
- St Nicholas Church, Newchurch
- St Nicholas Church, Wrea Green

==== Leicester ====
- St Nicholas Church, Leicester

==== Lincolnshire ====
- St Nicholas Church, Normanton
- St Nicholas' Church, South Ferriby

==== Merseyside ====
- Greek Orthodox Church of St Nicholas, Toxteth, Liverpool
- Church of Our Lady and St Nicholas, Liverpool
- St Nicholas Church, St Helens, Sutton
- St Nicholas Church, Wallasey
- St Nicholas Church, Whiston

==== Norfolk ====
- St Nicholas Church, North Walsham
- St Nicholas Church, Brandiston
- St Nicholas Church, Buckenham
- St Nicholas Church, Feltwell
- St Nicholas Church, Gayton
- Great Yarmouth Minster
- St Nicholas Chapel, King's Lynn; see King's Lynn
- St Nicholas, Blakeney, in the deanery of Holt and the Diocese of Norwich

==== North Yorkshire ====
- St Nicholas' Church, Askham Bryan
- St Nicholas' Church, Dunnington
- St. Nicholas's Church, Guisborough
- St Nicholas' Church, West Tanfield

==== Nottinghamshire ====
- St Nicholas Church, Nottingham
- St Nicholas Church, Littleborough

==== Oxfordshire ====
- St Nicolas Church, Abingdon (formerly within Berkshire)

==== Shropshire ====
- St Nicholas Church, Newport

==== Somerset ====
- Church of St Nicholas, Bathampton

==== South Yorkshire ====
- Bradfield Church, Sheffield

==== Surrey ====
- Church of St Nicholas, Thames Ditton
- St Nicolas Church, Guildford ("The Lower Church")
- St Nicholas' Church, Compton

==== Thurrock ====
- St Nicholas of Myra, South Ockendon

==== Tyne and Wear ====
- Newcastle Cathedral

==== Warwickshire ====
- St Nicolas Church, Nuneaton
- St Nicholas Church, Kenilworth

==== West Midlands (county) ====
- St Nicolas' Church, Kings Norton, Birmingham

==== West Sussex ====
- St Nicholas Church, West Itchenor, Chichester
- St Nicholas Church, Worth, Crawley
- St Nicolas Church, Shoreham-by-Sea

=== Scotland ===
- Kirk of St Nicholas, Aberdeen
- St Nicholas' Cardonald Church, Glasgow

=== Wales ===
- Church of St Nicholas, Trellech, Monmouthshire
- St Nicholas Church, Churchstoke, Powys

=== Northern Ireland ===
- St Nicholas' Church, Carrickfergus, County Antrim

== United States ==
- St. Nicholas Russian Orthodox Church (Juneau, Alaska)
- St. Nicholas Russian Orthodox Church (Kwethluk, Alaska)
- St. Nicholas Church (Nikolski, Alaska)
- St. Nicholas Chapel (Nondalton, Alaska)
- St. Nicholas Church (Pilot Point, Alaska)
- St. Nicholas Chapel (Sand Point, Alaska)
- St. Nicholas Chapel (Seldovia, Alaska)
- Saint Nicholas Orthodox Church (Arkansas)
- St. Nicholas Greek Orthodox Cathedral (Tarpon Springs, Florida)
- St. Nicholas Cathedral (Chicago), Illinois
- St. Nicholas Orthodox Church and Rectory, Salem, Massachusetts
- St. Nicholas of Tolentine Church, Atlantic City, New Jersey
- St. Nicholas Catholic Church (Passaic, New Jersey)
- St. Nicholas Greek Orthodox Church (Manhattan), New York City, destroyed in the September 11, 2001 attacks and rebuilt in 2022
- St. Nicholas Kirche (New York City), Manhattan, New York City, demolished 1960
- St. Nicholas Russian Orthodox Cathedral (Manhattan), New York City
- St. Nicholas Ukrainian Catholic Church, Watervliet, New York
- St. Nicholas Catholic Church (Osgood, Ohio)
- St. Nicholas Catholic Church (Zanesville, Ohio)
- St. Nicholas Croatian Church (Millvale, Pennsylvania)
- St. Nicholas Byzantine Catholic Church, Perryopolis, Pennsylvania
- St. Nicholas Croatian Church (Troy Hill, Pennsylvania), in Pittsburgh
- Saint Nicholas Greek Orthodox Cathedral (Pittsburgh), Pennsylvania
- St. Nicholas Cathedral (Washington, D.C.)

== Uruguay ==
- Saint Nicholas Greek Orthodox Church, Montevideo
