= Drajčići =

Drajçiq: Drajçiq (Albanian); Драјчићи/Drajčići (Serbian)
- Village
- Location in Kosovo
- Location: Kosovo
- District: Prizren
- Municipality: Prizren

Population (2024)
  - Total: 143
- Time zone: UTC+1 (CET)
  - Summer (DST): UTC+2 (CEST)

Drajčići (Serbian Cyrillic: Драјчићи, Albanian: Drajçiq) is a village in the Prizren Municipality in Kosovo, situated in the historical region of Sredačka župa. The village has a total population of 200 people of whom 90% are Bosniaks and 10% are Serbs.

== History ==
The Serbian Orthodox Church of St. Nicholas was built in the 16th century. There is also a mosque in the village for the Muslim inhabitants.

In 1947, there was a total of 70 households, out of which the majority were Serbian Orthodox (61), the rest Muslim (9). The Serb families included the Ugrinović, Đurđević, Đorđević, Jovanović, Mihajlović, Simić, Nikolić and Spasić. 19 households belonged to native families, the rest descended from 17th and 18th-century settlers from Old Herzegovina (Nikšić), Tetovo region and Prizren.

On December 29, 2013, the government of the Republic of Kosovo started to demolish the Serbian school in Drajčići, built in 1904, at a time when Kosovo was still under Ottoman rule. It is one of the oldest schools in the Prizren municipality. The demolishing was met with criticism by Kosovo Serb officials.
