= Spasić =

Spasić (Serbian: Спасић) is a Serbian surname.

== Geographical distribution ==
As of 2014, 84.9% of all known bearers of the surname Spasić were residents of Serbia (frequency 1:748), 6.6% of Kosovo (1:2,516), 5.2% of the Republic of Macedonia (1:3,578), 1.3% of Montenegro (1:4,241) and 1.2% of Bosnia and Herzegovina (1:26,386).

In Serbia, the frequency of the surname was higher than national average (1:748) in the following regions:

1. Pirot District (1:170)
2. Pčinja District (1:253)
3. Jablanica District (1:276)
4. Nišava District (1:289)
5. Braničevo District (1:412)
6. Zaječar District (1:432)
7. Pomoravlje District (1:438)
8. Podunavlje District (1:518)
9. Bor District (1:530)
10. Šumadija District (1:578)
11. Rasina District (1:582)
12. Toplica District (1:644)

== People ==
- Jovan Spasić (1909–1981), football goalkeeper
- Irena Spasić, computer scientist
- Milan Spasić (1909–1941), navy officer
- Nikola Spasić (1838–1916), businessman, benefactor and humanitarian
- Petar Spasić (born 1992), footballer
- Predrag Spasić (born 1965), footballer
- Slađan Spasić (born 1973), footballer
- Slobodan Spasić (born 1977), sprinter
- Nikola Spasic (born 2006), musician, podcaster
