= Irena Spasić =

Serbian computer scientist

Irena Spasić is a Serbian computer scientist specializing in text mining of biomedical information, with applications including exometabolomics. She is a professor of computer science and informatics at Cardiff University, director of the Cardiff University Data Innovation Research Institute, and since 2020 a Fellow of the Learned Society of Wales.

Spasić is a graduate of the University of Belgrade and earned her Ph.D. in computer science at the University of Salford. She was a postdoctoral researcher at the University of Manchester before taking her present position in Cardiff.
