= Saint Nicholas's Church (Drajčići) =

Cultural heritage monument of Kosovo

Saint Nicholas’s Church
- Kisha e Nikollës së Shejntë, Drajqiq (Albanian)
- Interactive map of Saint Nicholas’s Church
- Location: Drajčići, Prizren, Kosovo

History
- Built: ca. 1575-1600

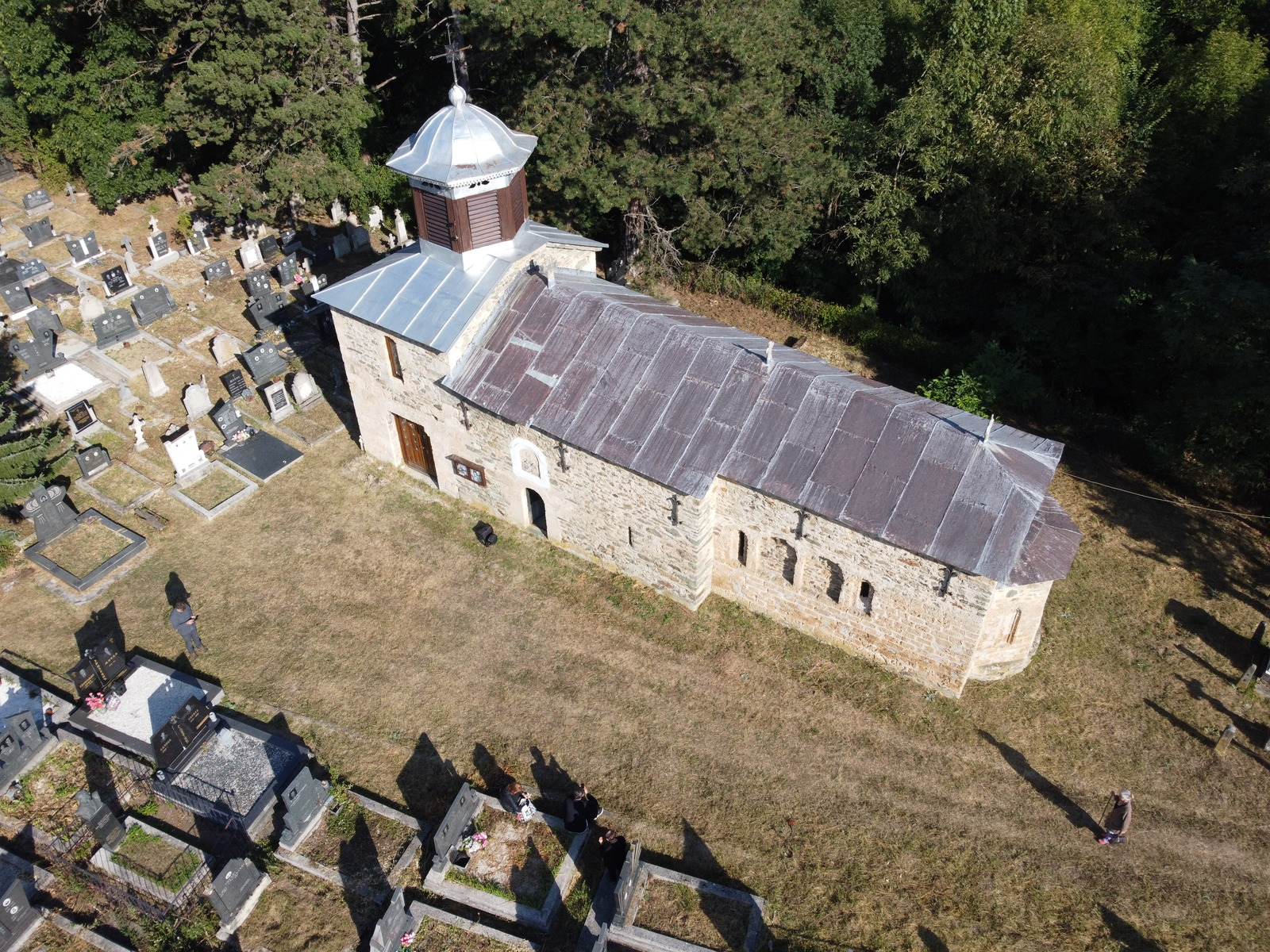
Aerial view of the church

Saint Nicholas's Church is a cultural heritage monument in Drajčići, Prizren, Kosovo.

The church, dedicated to Saint Nicholas, lies in the Milaçiq neighborhood of Sredska, near the primary school, and was built around 1575-1600. Sredska is located 12 kilometres (7.5 mi) west of Prizren on the road to Prevalla. The rectangular-plan church includes a triangular apse on the eastern wall, and its one story is covered by a semi-arched vault. The western entrance includes the narthex and bell tower. The building includes a mix of tuff and river stones bound with lime mortar, with no plaster on the outside but white plaster on the interior. The two-story roof is covered with lead and sheet metal tiles, and the façade includes semicircular windows and similarly arched niches. An elaborate iconostasis can be found on the interior wall. The village cemetery is located in the churchyard.
