= Exometabolomics =

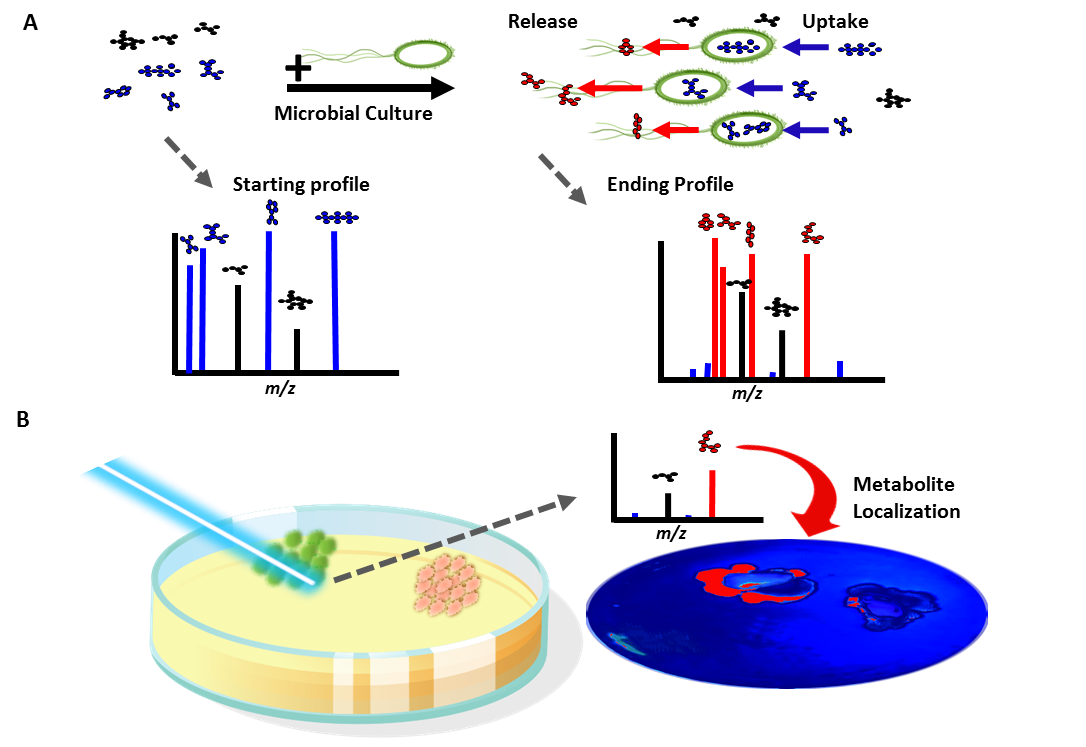
A model exometabolomic experiment set up from liquid culture, for LC–MS (A), and from agar plates, for MSI (B).

Exometabolomics, also known as 'metabolic footprinting', is the study of extracellular metabolites and is a sub-field of metabolomics.

While the same analytical approaches used for profiling metabolites apply to exometabolomics, including liquid-chromatography mass spectrometry (LC-MS), nuclear magnetic resonance (NMR) and gas chromatography–mass spectrometry (GC–MS), analysis of exometabolites provides specific challenges and is most commonly focused on investigation of the transformations of exogenous metabolite pools by biological systems. Typically, these experiments are performed by comparing metabolites at two or more time points, for example, spent vs. uninoculated/control culture media; this approach can differentiate different physiological states of wild-type yeast and between yeast mutants. Since, in many cases, the exometabolite (extracellular) pool is less dynamic than endometabolite (intracellular) pools (which are often perturbed during sample processing) and chemically defined media can be used, it reduces some of the experimental challenges of metabolomics.

Exometabolomics is also used as a complementary tool with genomic, transcriptomic and proteomic data, to gain insight into the function of genes and pathways. Additionally, exometabolomics can be used to measure polar molecules being consumed or released by an organism, and to measure secondary metabolite production.

== History ==
The study of extracellular metabolites has been prevalent in scientific literature. However, global exometabolite profiling was only realized with recent advances allowing for improved chromatographic separation and detection of hundreds to thousands of compounds by the mid-2000s. The first work to demonstrate the biological relevance of comparative profiling of exometabolite pools was not until 2003, when the term "metabolite footprinting" was coined by Jess Allen and coworkers. This work attracted a great deal of interest in the community, particularly for characterization of microbial metabolism. The idea of the "exometabolome" encompassing the components of the exometabolite pool was not introduced until 2005.

Recent advances in mass spectrometry imaging have allowed for spatial localization of released metabolites. As the field of microbiology becomes increasingly more centered on microbial community structure, exometabolomics has provided for rapid understanding of metabolic interactions between two or more species. Recently, exometabolomics has been used to design co-culture systems. Because the analysis of extracellular metabolites allows for the predictions and determinations of metabolite exchange, exometabolomics analyses can be used for understanding community ecological networks.

== Analytical technologies ==
In principle, any technologies used for metabolomics can be used for exometabolomics. However, liquid chromatography–mass spectrometry (LC–MS) has been the most widely used. As with typical metabolomic measurements, metabolites are identified based on accurate mass, retention time, and their MS/MS fragmentation patterns, in comparison to authentic standards. Chromatographies typically used are hydrophilic interaction liquid chromatography for the measurement of polar metabolites, or reversed-phase (C18) chromatography for the measurement of non-polar compounds, lipids, and secondary metabolites. Gas chromatography–mass spectrometry can also be used to measure sugars and other carbohydrates, and to obtain complete metabolic profiles.

Because LC–MS does not give spatial data on metabolite localization, it can be complemented with mass spectrometry imaging (MSI).

== Applications ==
Exometabolomic techniques have been used in the following fields:

=== Functional genomics ===
Metabolite utilization to annotate function of unknown genes.

=== Bioenergy ===
In lignocellulosic feedstock studies.

=== Agriculture and food ===
Characterization of plant root exometabolites to determine how exometabolites affect Plant-growth promoting rhizobacteria.

Metabolic footprinting of yeast strains for identification of yeast strains optimal for enhancing fermentation performance and positive attributes in wine.

=== Health ===
Differentiating healthy versus cancerous bladder cells with metabolic footprinting.

Footprinting, in combination with other techniques, for early recognition of outbreak and strain characterization.

Studying aging with C. elegans exometabolomics.

Extracellular metabolite analysis to evaluate pathogenic mechanism of intracellular protozoal parasite.

=== Analysis of carbon cycling ===
Global carbon fixation, phytoplankton/dinoflaggelate interactions, and exometabolomics.

=== Microbial communities ===
Interaction of E. coli exometabolites with C. elegans affects life span.

Bacteria and yeast in dairy systems.

=== Metabolic niche partitioning ===
In 2010, exometabolomics analysis of the cyanobacterium, Synechococcus sp. PCC 7002 by Baran, et al. revealed that this photoautotroph could deplete a diverse pool of exogenous metabolites. A follow-up exometabolomics study on sympatric microbial isolates from biological soil crust, which exist in communities with cyanobacteria in the desert soils of the Colorado Plateau, suggested that metabolite niche partitioning exists in these communities, where each isolate only utilizes 13-26% of metabolites from the soil

=== Secondary metabolites ===
Metabolic footprinting for determination of antifungal substances' mode of action

== See also ==
- Mass spectrometry
- Metabolomics
- Metabolome
- Metabolite fingerprinting
- Mass spectrometry imaging
