= St Nicholas' Chapel, Għargħur =

Chapel of St Nicholas
- Kappella ta' San Nikola
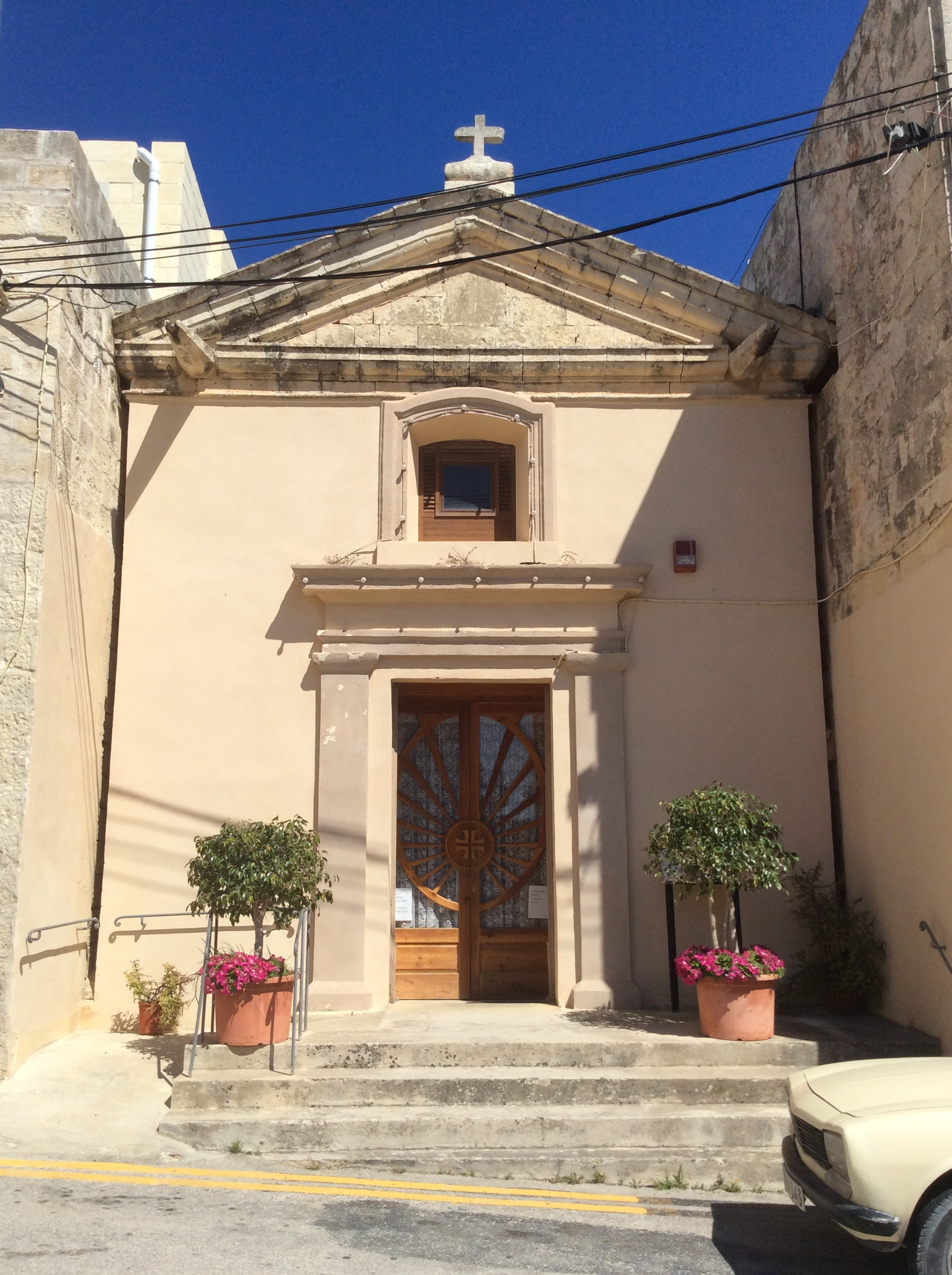

- Location within Malta
- 35°55′34.7″N 14°27′08.7″E
- Location: Għargħur
- Country: Malta
- Denomination: Roman Catholic

History
- Dedication: Saint Nicholas

Architecture
- Completed: 1680

Administration
- Archdiocese: Malta

Clergy
- Archbishop: Charles Scicluna

The Chapel of St Nicholas is a small Roman Catholic 17th-century church located in Għargħur, Malta.

== Origins ==
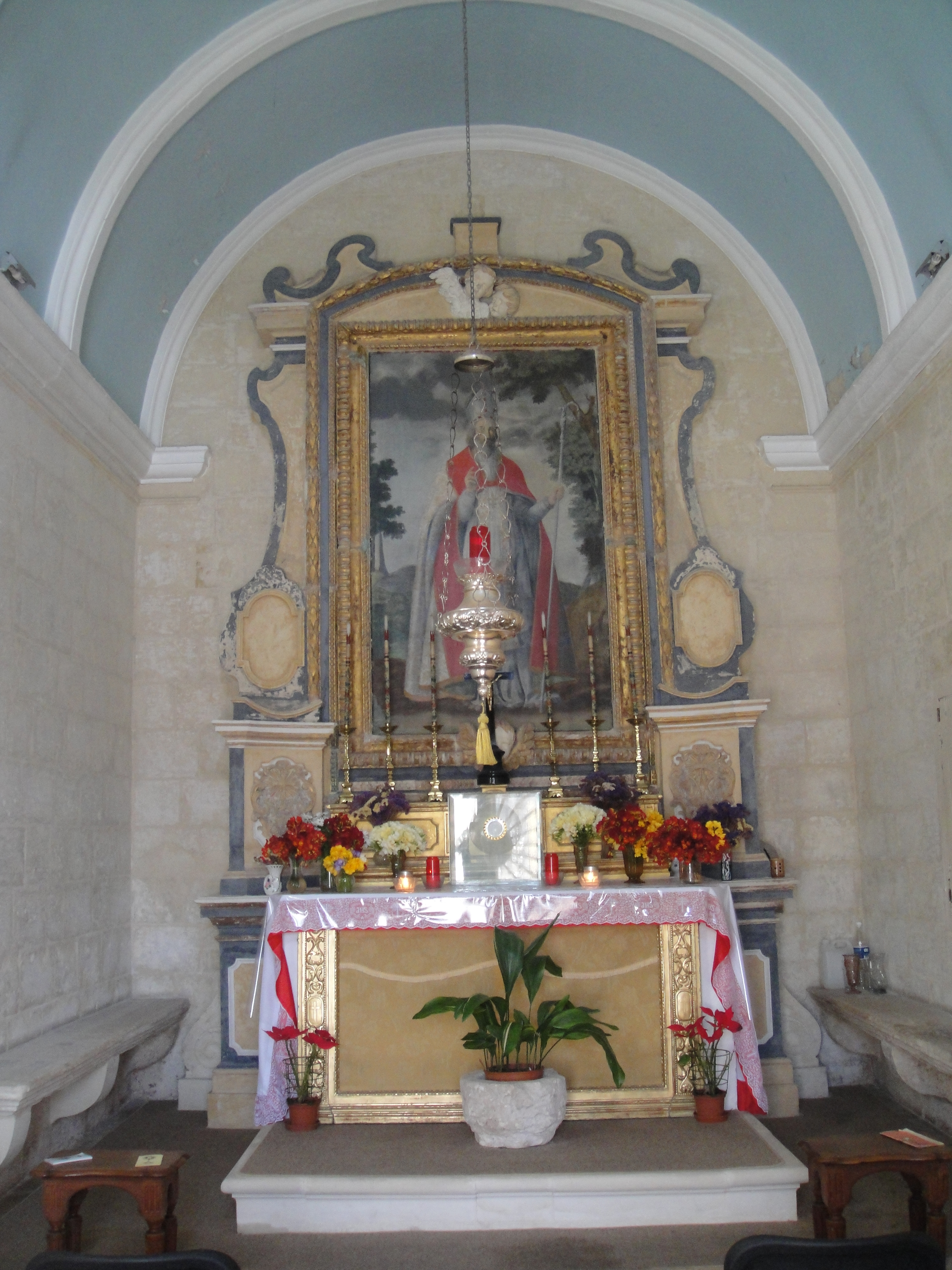
Interior of the church

The chapel was originally built in the 15th century. In 1575, when inquisitor Pietro Dusina visited Mata he found that the chapel was in a very bad state, with its roof collapsed. He ordered that the chapel be closed and its stone be used in the building of the Parish church of Naxxar. However, it seems that the church was rebuilt within a short time since Bishop Baldassare Cagliares reports that during his 1615 visit, the chapel was in a very good state. The chapel is mentioned once more when Bishop Pietro Francesco Pontremoli, who was vicar general of the diocese, visited the chapel in 1634. He noted that there was a painting depicting St Nicholas and that the church had the privilege of ecclesiastical immunity.

Nonetheless, even though past bishops describe that the chapel was in a good state, when Bishop Miguel Jerónimo de Molina visited the chapel in 1680, he found that the chapel was rebuilt in that same year. In 1744 Archbishop Paul Alphéran de Bussan mentions that the feast in honour of St Nicholas was celebrated every 6 December in the chapel with sung vespers and a mass.

By time the church was used as a storage space for statues used during Holy Week however in 2005 the chapel was restored and opened for religious purposes.

== Interior ==
The chapel has one altar and a painting depicting Saint Nicholas dating from the middle of the 17th century and attributed to Gaspare Formica.
