= New St. Nicholas Church, Focșani =

Heritage site in Vrancea County, Romania

Coordinates: 45°41′41″N 27°11′02″E

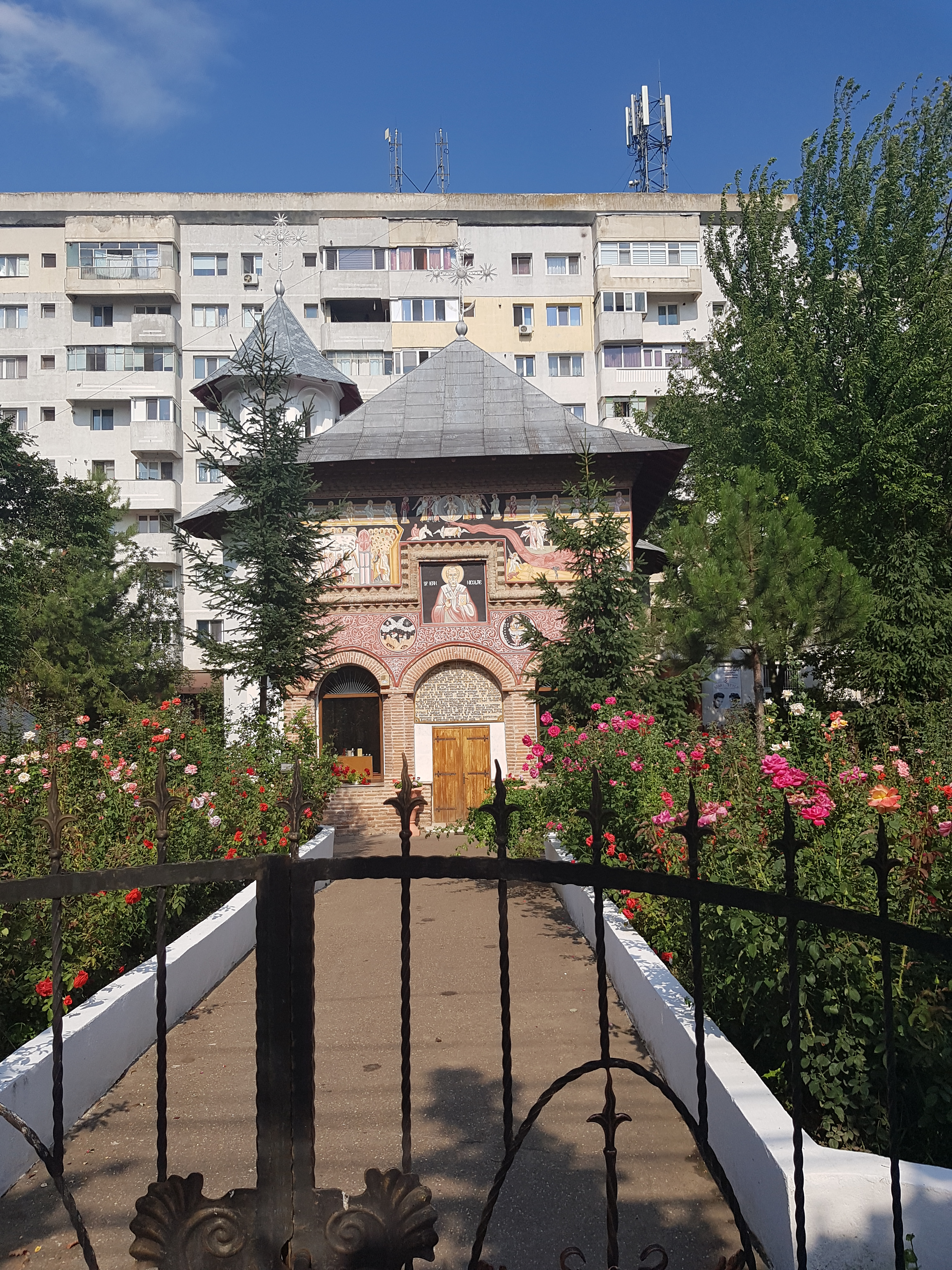
New St. Nicholas Church

The New St. Nicholas Church (Romanian: Biserica Sfântul Nicolae Nou) is a Romanian Orthodox church located at 7 Popa Șapcă Street in Focșani, Romania. It is dedicated to Saint Nicholas.

The church is situated at the border between two former estates, and was founded by vassals of the Princes of Wallachia. It was mentioned as a monastery in 1694, originally a wooden church from the 1680s. That structure burned in 1732, and was rebuilt the same year. Paharnic Constantin Năsturel paid for the new structure, made of thick brick with a porch.

The interior was painted after 1746, with the ktetors appearing on the south wall. Various donors financed later expansions, including a lot for the parish house and a large bell. As of 1819, the parish was considered among the best maintained and endowed in the Buzău Diocese.

The church features a trefoil shape, with polygonal apses and a westerly porch. The bell tower is adjacent to the north wall of the narthex, on its exterior. The upper part of the tower is hexagonal, with its own roof. The porch, initially open, has stone columns supporting semicircular arches. Further columns and arches separate the narthex and nave. The facade is in two registers of brick, divided by a projecting row. The window frames are carved with plant motifs.

The church is listed as a historic monument by Romania's Ministry of Culture and Religious Affairs.
