= St. Nicholas Orthodox Church, Tallinn =

Church building in Tallinn, Estonia

Coordinates: 59.43906°N 24.74871°E

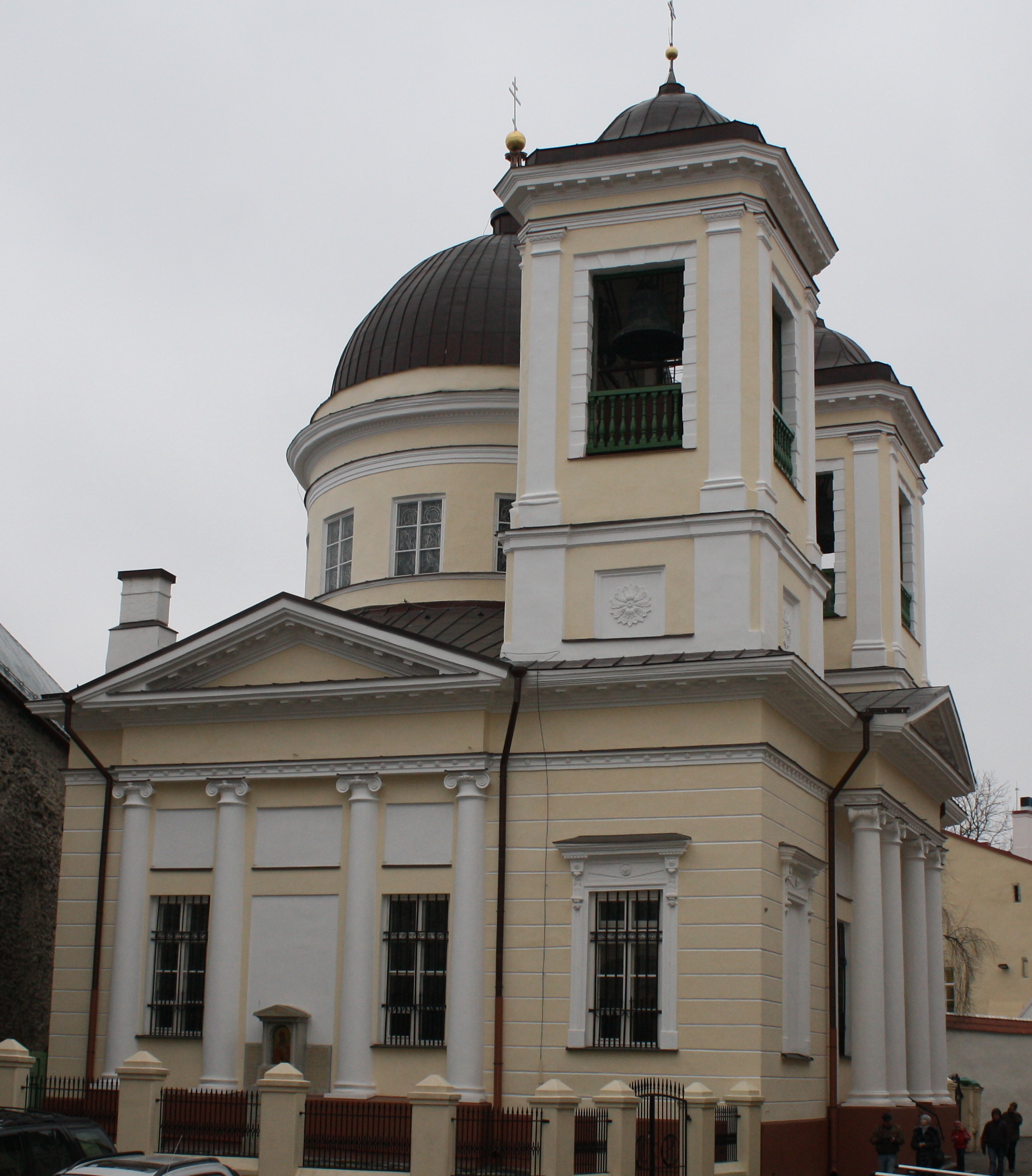
St. Nicholas Orthodox Church

St. Nicholas Orthodox Church, Tallinn (Estonian: Tallinna Nikolai kirik) is an Orthodox church in Tallinn, Estonia. The church is named after Saint Nicholas. The church is chosen one of the Estonian cultural monuments being both architectural monument and historical monument.

The church is built during 1820–1827, it was designed by Luigi Rusca. The church is featured predominantly by classicism.
