= St. Nicholas Church, Zărnești =

Orthodox church in Zărnești, Romania

Coordinates: 45°33′37″N 25°18′58″E

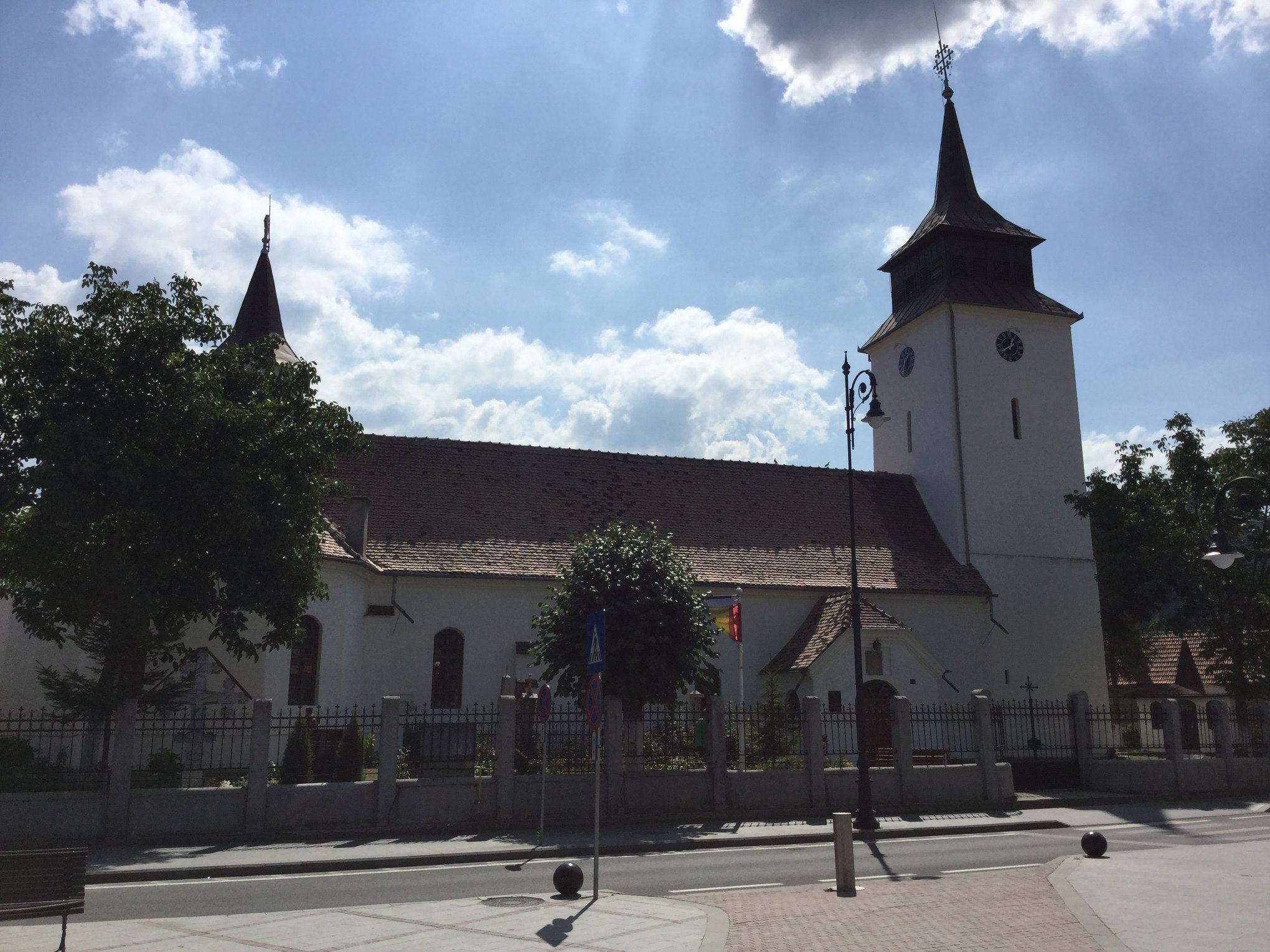
St. Nicholas Church

St. Nicholas Church (Romanian: Biserica Sfântul Nicolae) is a Romanian Orthodox church located at 1 Tiberiu Spârchez Street, Zărnești, Romania. It is dedicated to Saint Nicholas.

The town’s oldest church, it is the third-earliest stone Orthodox church in Țara Bârsei. According to the pisanie, it was founded in 1515 by Neagoe Basarab, Prince of Wallachia, although for unexplained reasons, his name is not mentioned on the inscription. Initially quite small, it was completed in the late 17th century when a chapel was joined to the narthex. Prince Șerban Cantacuzino reportedly donated funds during the late phase of construction. The authorities of nearby Brașov also made contributions: two florins in 1574, ten florins for bells in 1577. In 1580, Orthodox believers gave various gifts. According to oral tradition, in 1690, after forces of the Crimean Khanate burned down the town during the Battle of Zărnești, the church was the only building left standing, with its brick and stone walls.

Repairs and completion took place in 1810 with the help of local residents. At that point, it acquired a shape similar to St. Nicholas Church in Șcheii Brașovului. The iconostasis dates to that time, as does the large square bell tower, with thick walls, standing behind the narthex. A plaque on the facade mentions Emperor Francis I and the new ktetors. The interior was painted in 1810, the chapel in 1872 and the whole again in 1964–1965. The 1515 pisanie is kept at the Romanian Academy; copies were made in 1804, 1881 and 1973. The church underwent wholesale repairs in 1992–1995, including a new roof and double windows.

The church and chapel are listed as historic monuments by Romania's Ministry of Culture and Religious Affairs.
