= Church of St. Nicholas, Telšiai =

Church in Telšiai, Lithuania

Telšiai Russian Orthodox St. Nicholas church
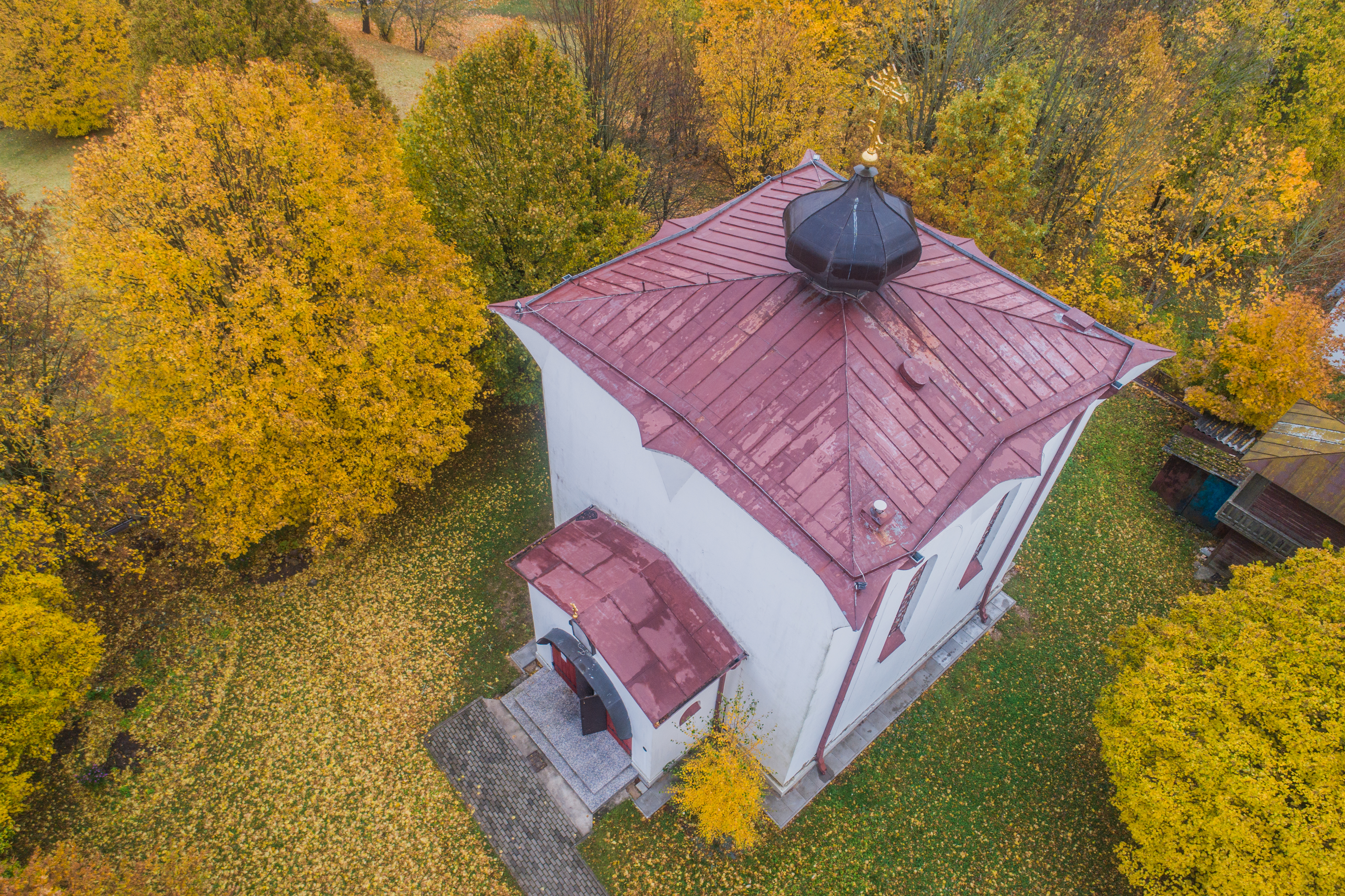
- Interactive map of the Telšiai Russian Orthodox St. Nicholas church area

General information
- Type: Bernardine monastery, Cathedral and the seminary
- Location: Telšiai, Lithuania
- Coordinates: 55.9872994°N 22.2444885°E

Telšiai Russian Orthodox St. Nicholas church is a church in Lithuania noted for its architectural style, belonging to the Russian Orthodox Diocese of Lithuania.

== History ==
The Russian Orthodox church, dedicated to Saint Nicholas, was built for the first time in 1867 upon Vilnius hill, upon demolishing the Catholic church and destroying the old graveyard of the city. Due to local dissatisfaction, a petition was sent to the Czar of Russia with little success. More than 70 years later, in 1932 by the decision of the Supreme Tribunal of Lithuania, the Orthodox Church was passed on to the Catholic community.

In 1935, the Russian Orthodox community, upon receipt of the compensation for the tribunal's decision, acquired a plot of land on the Northern part of the city and hired architect Vsevovoldas Kopylovas to design their new church.

St. Nicholas church was built in cubist style. The planning structure base is the cuboid shaped space of 10m x 10m x 10m, crowned with an onion shaped dome and surrounded with a massive protruding moulding prominent in cubist architecture. The three-level hand-crafted oak iconostasis was transferred from the old 19th century Orthodox church to the new one. The Russian Orthodox church is unique in its architectural use of cubism in Telšiai region and in the whole of Lithuania.

== Gallery ==
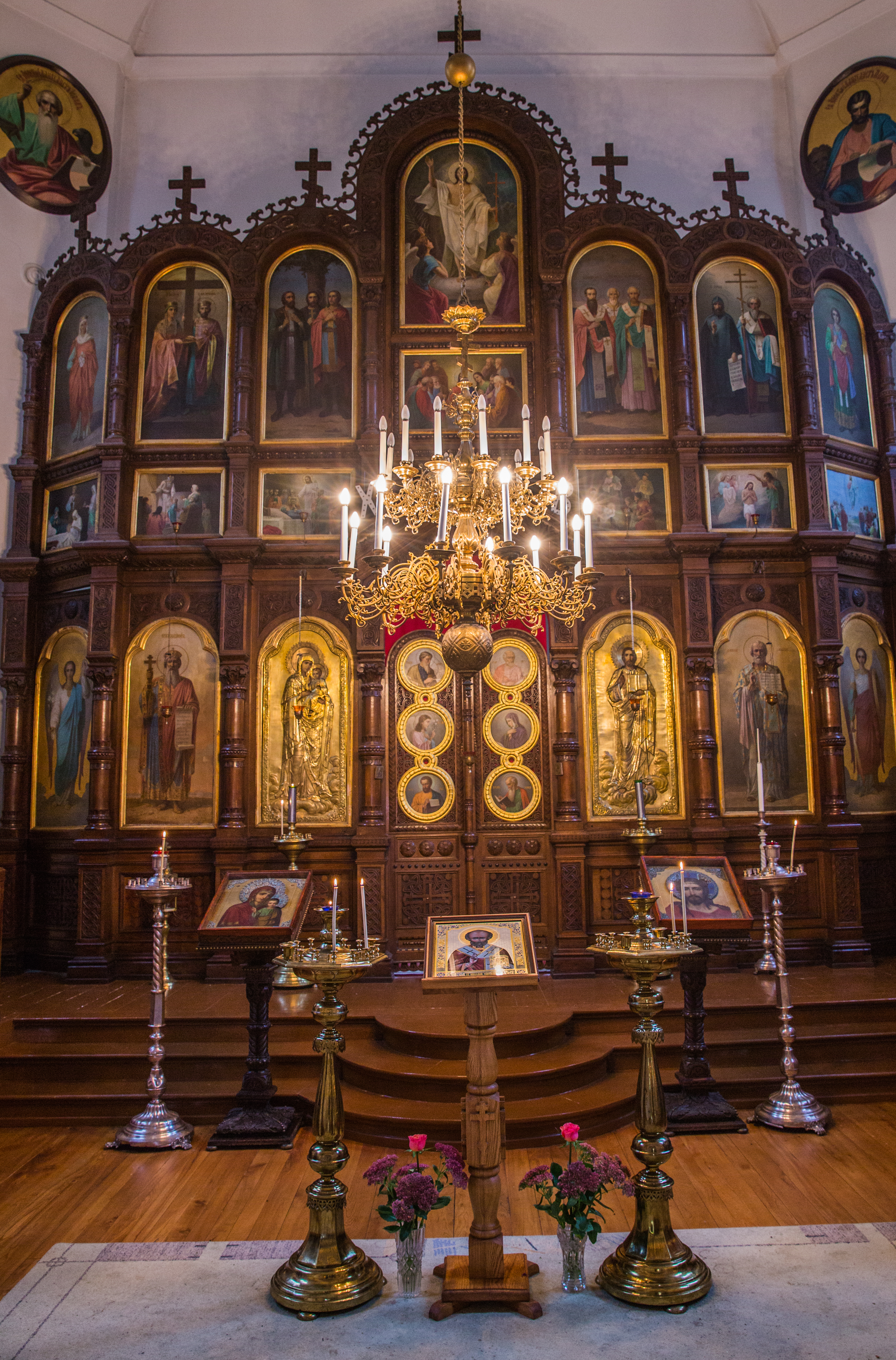

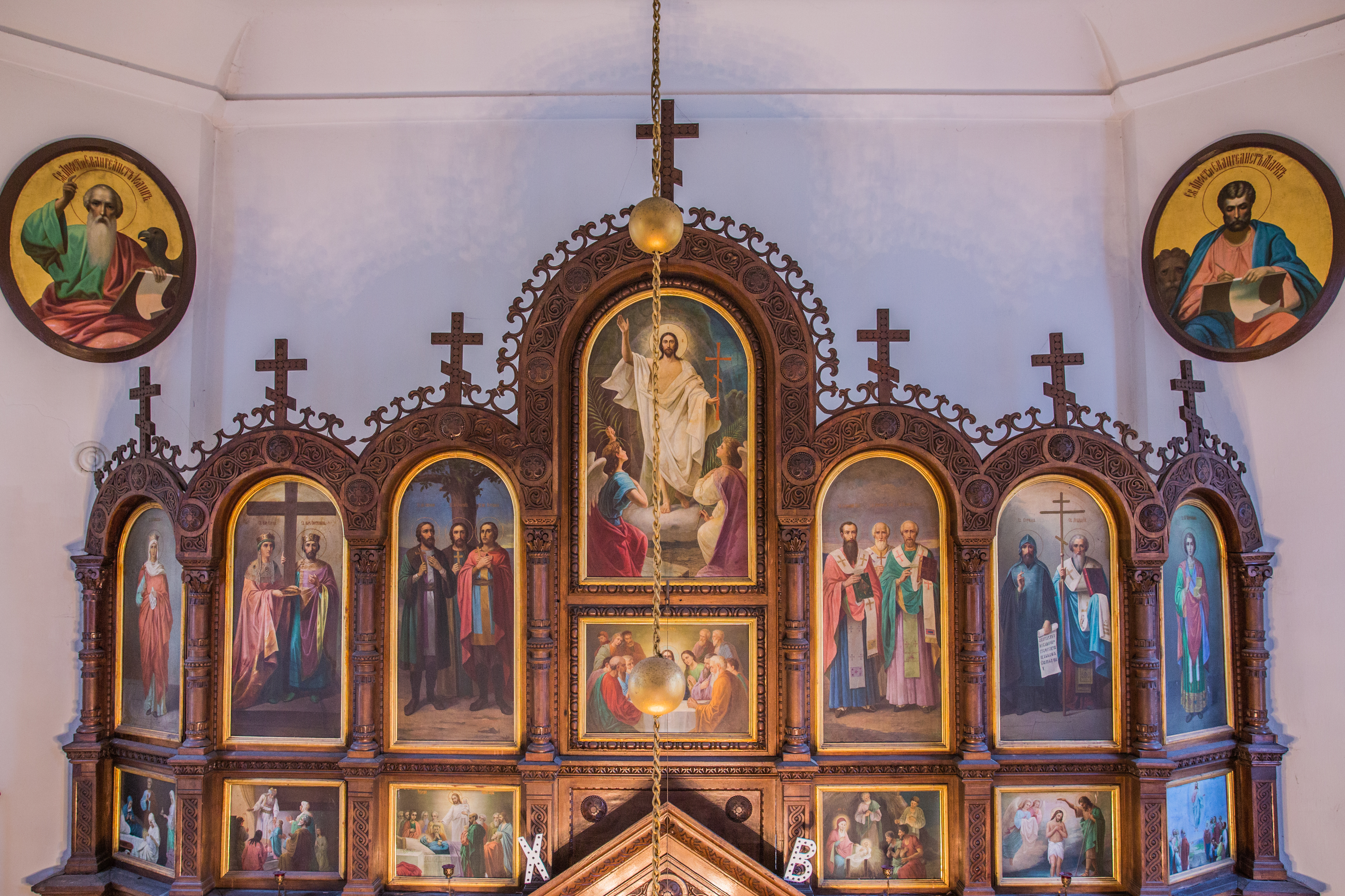

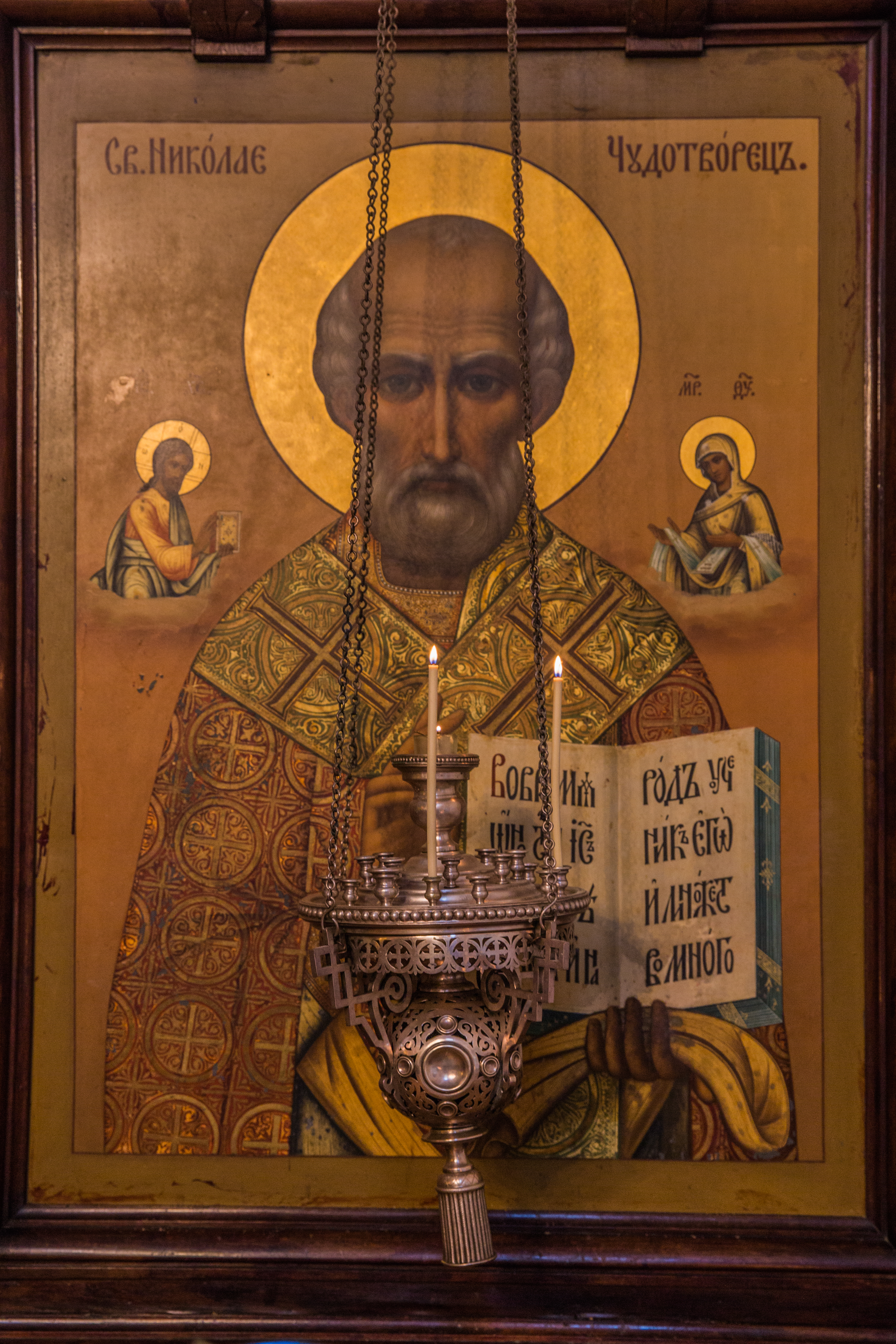

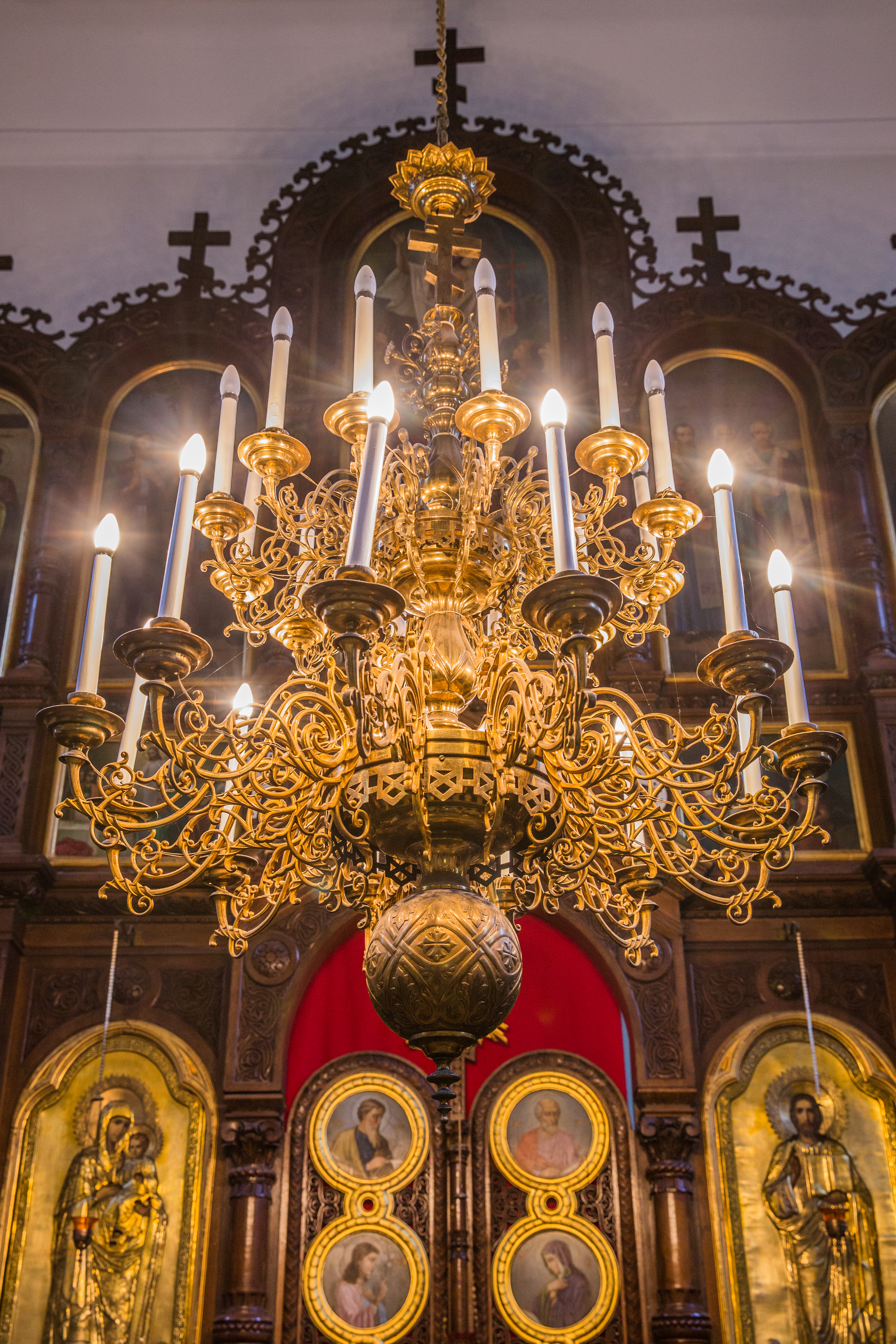

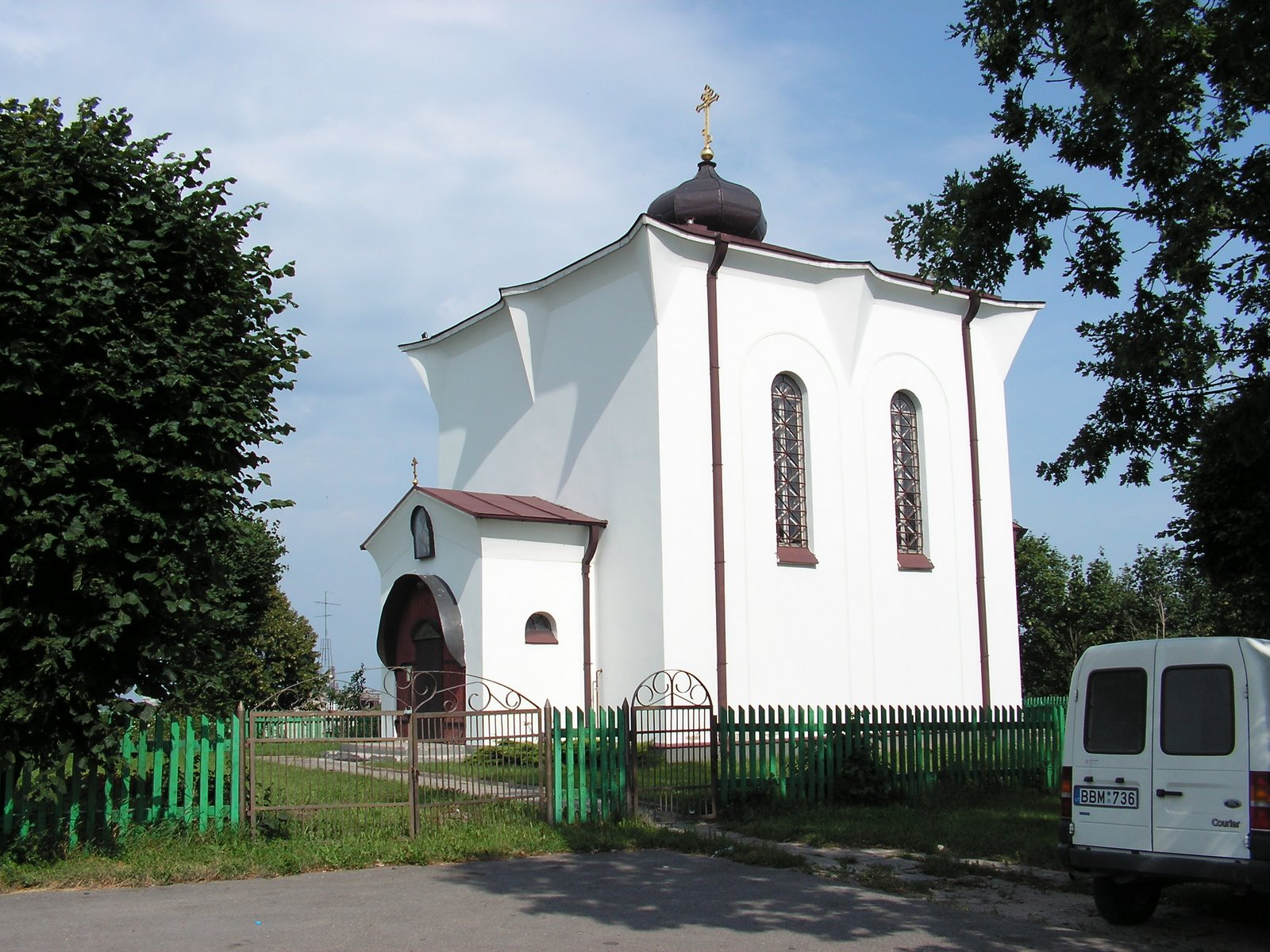
