= Saint Nicholas's Church (Mušnikovo) =

Church building in Mušnikovo, Serbia

Saint Nicholas’s Church
- Kisha e Nikollës së Shejntë (Albanian)
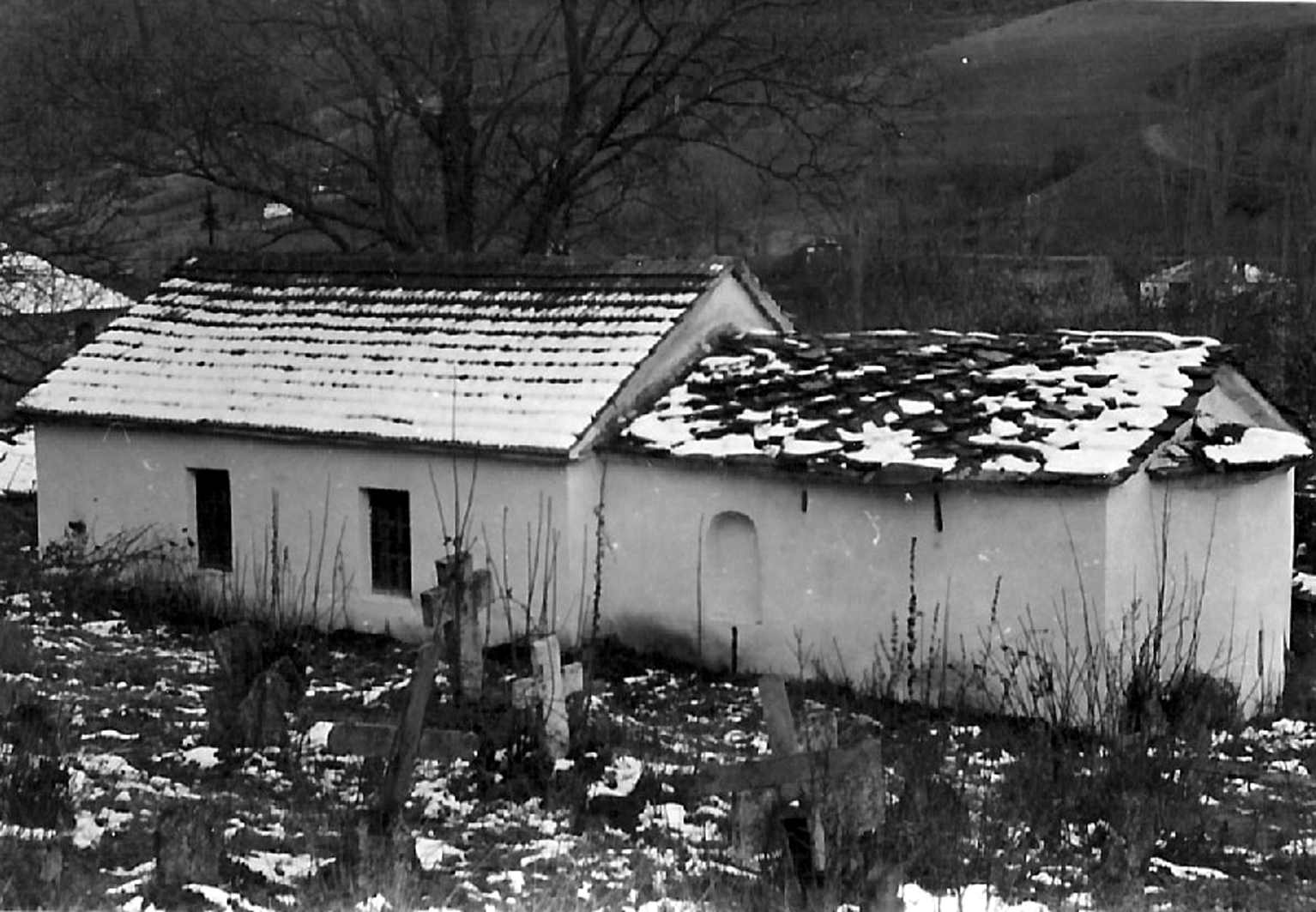
- Church of Saint Nicholas in Mušnikovo, Prizren
- Interactive map of Saint Nicholas’s Church
- Location: Mušnikovo, Prizren, Kosovo

History
- Built: Middle Ages

Saint Nicholas's Church is a cultural heritage monument in Mušnikovo, Prizren, Kosovo.

== History ==
Saint Nicholas's Church lies west of Mušnikovo, 15.8 kilometres (9.8 mi) from Prizren. It is a one-nave rectangular church with a triangular apse facing eastward. The interior frescos point to construction in the 16th century from stone bound with lime mortar plastered on the outside under a two-layer stone slab roof. Two rectangular windows and two niches with semi-arched openings, one of each on the northern and one on the southern façade, are among the notable external features, along with a western annex still not opening to the older structure. The annex, like the main church, is rectangular and plastered white on the outside, but with the two-layer roof made instead of galvanized sheet metal. The reinforced concrete bell tower, with its four-layer clay tile roof, was built recently and faces westward from the annex. The churchyard doubles as the local cemetery.
