= Saint Nicolas Church, Toulouse =

Saint-Nicolas Church (Toulouse)
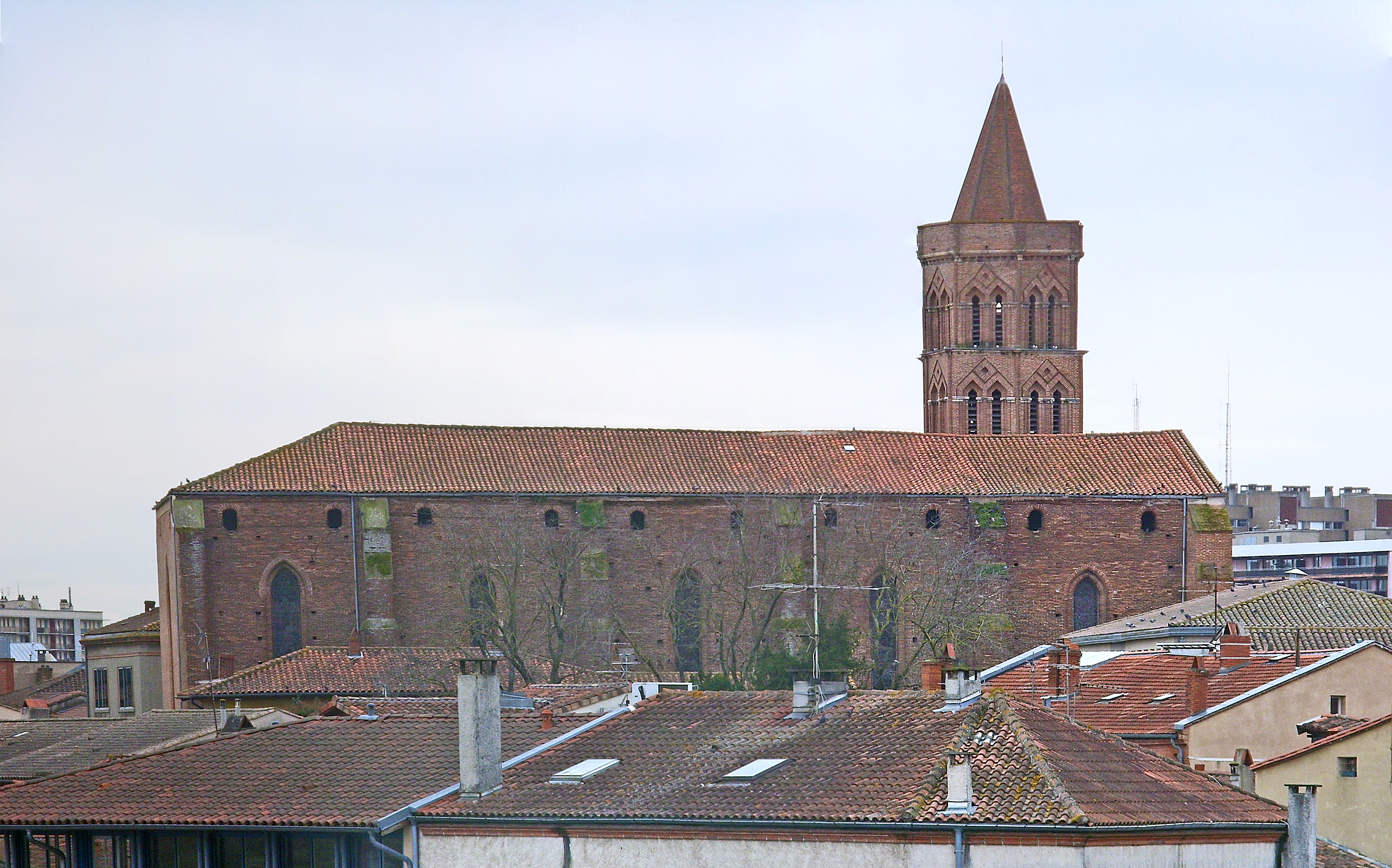
- Saint Nicolas Church

Religion
- Affiliation: Roman Catholic
- Province: Archdiocese of Toulouse
- Region: Midi-Pyrénées

Location
- Location: 25 Grande Rue Saint-Nicolas, 31000 Toulouse, France
- State: Haute-Garonne
- Interactive map of Saint-Nicolas Church (Toulouse)
- Coordinates: 43.599271°N 1.434257°E

Architecture
- Type: Church
- Style: Gothic architecture
- Groundbreaking: XIVe (Bell Tower)

Saint-Nicolas Church is located in Saint Cyprien neighbourhood on the west side of the Garonne River, just outside the old city walls of Toulouse. Nicknamed "The Beautiful Unknown/Stranger", it is the second oldest church of the city.

== Description ==
Saint Nicolas is the patron saint of travellers, sailors and those afraid of sinking. He might have been frequently solicited in a neighbourhood that is known for yearly flash floods, with the 1875 flood - which, counting only victims in Toulouse, killed an estimated 209 and left 25,000 without housing - as one of the most significant examples.

Built on foundations dating back to the 12th Century, its Tolosan style octagonal bell tower was rebuilt around 1300, copying those of Saint Sernin and Church of the Jacobins. Its interior neo-gothic frescos representing the life of Saint Nicholas were made towards the end of the 19th century by Bernard Bénézet, an Occitan painter and historian. Another Fresco, renovated in 2014, dates back to the 18th century and is attributed to Tolosan painter Jean-Baptiste Despax.

== Gallery ==
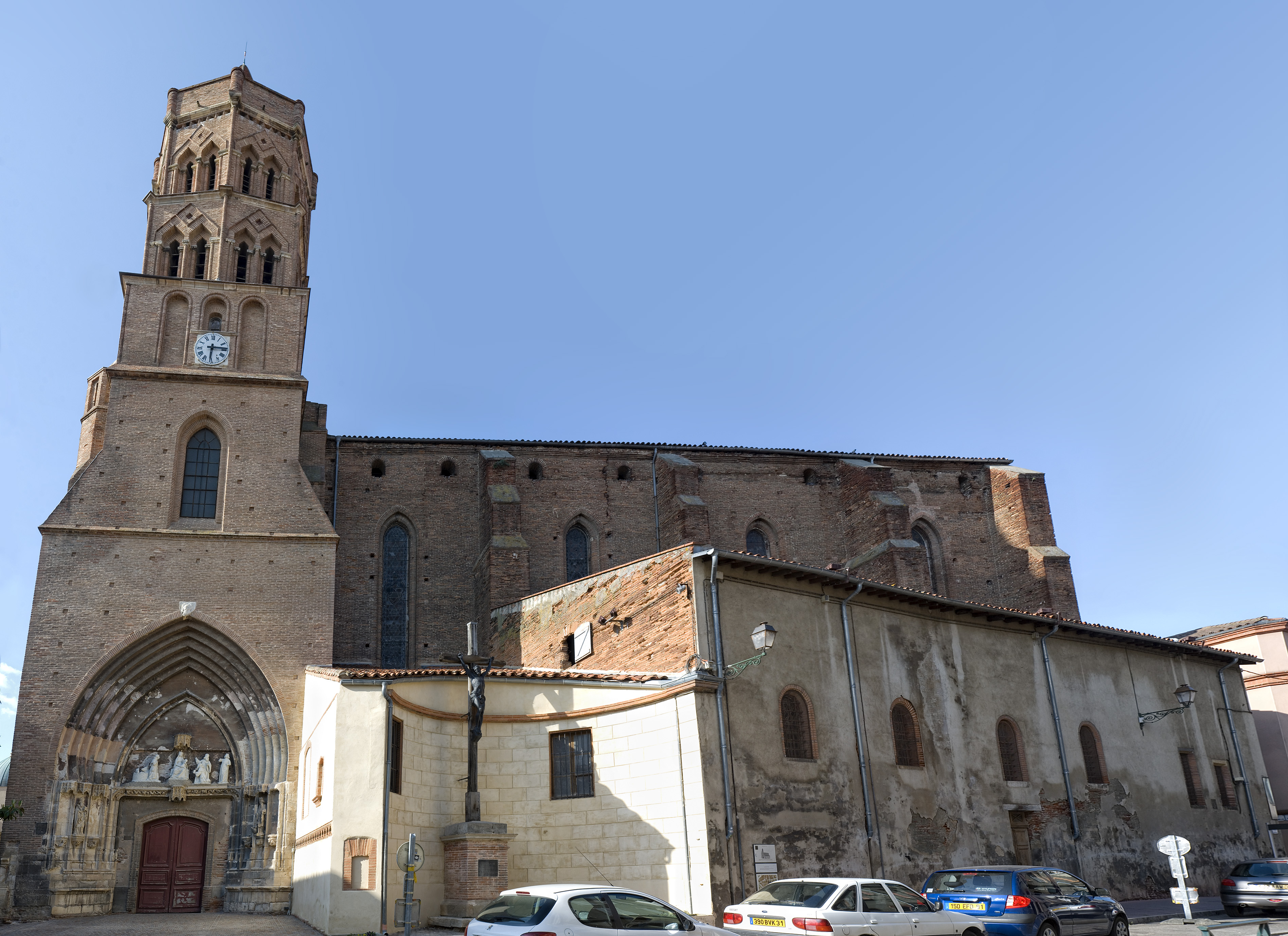
Overview in 2008, before restoration

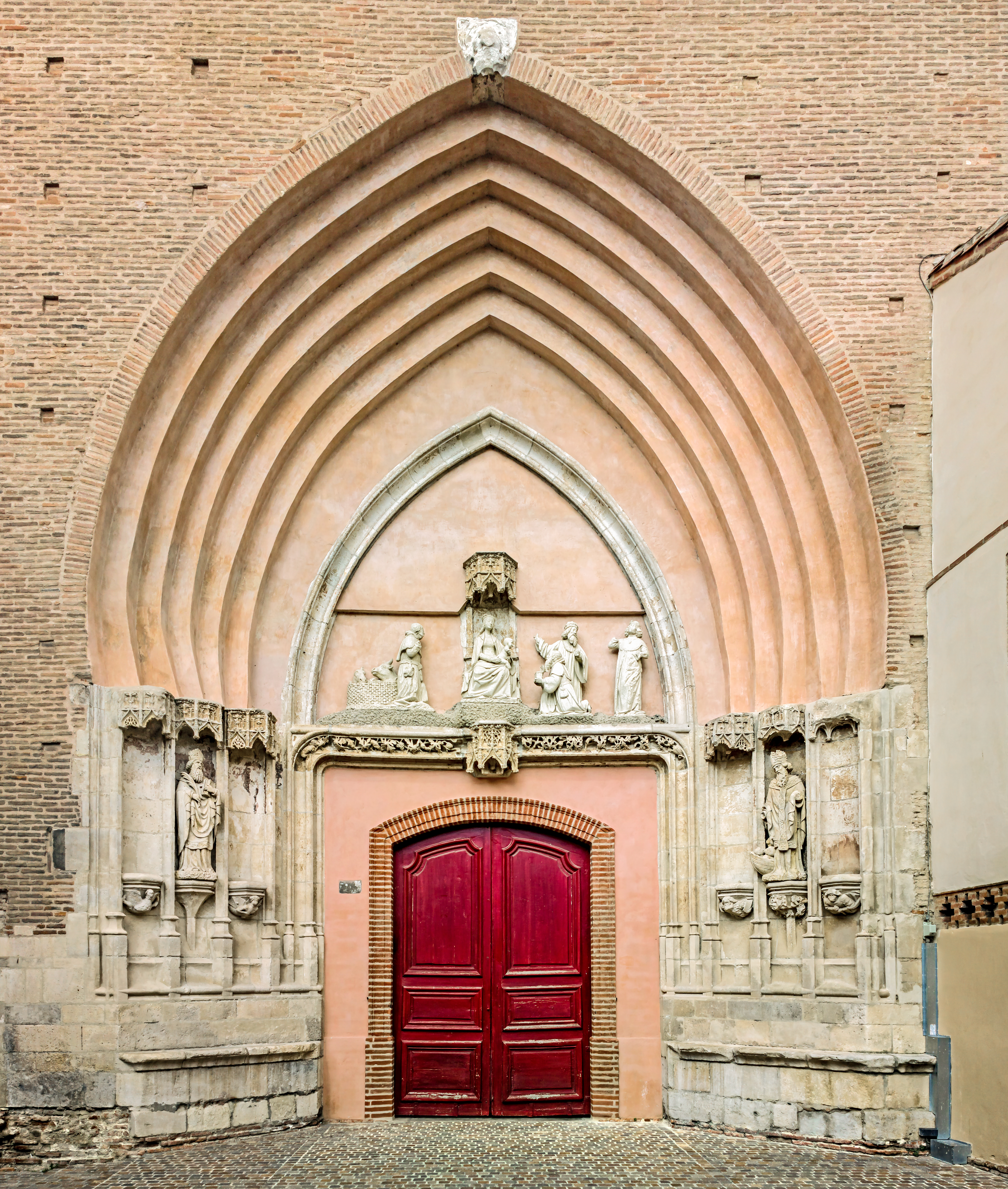
Portal

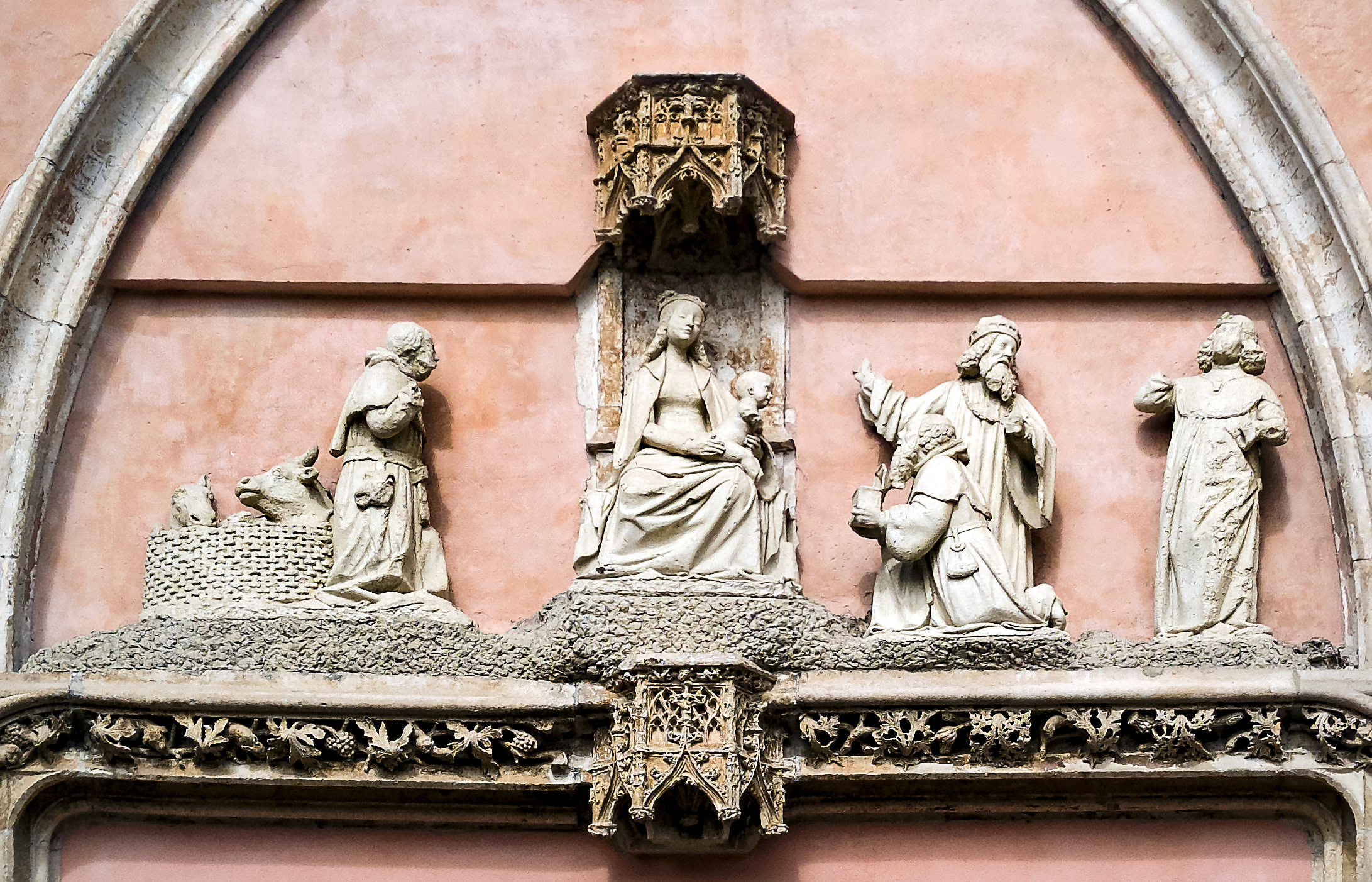
Tympanum

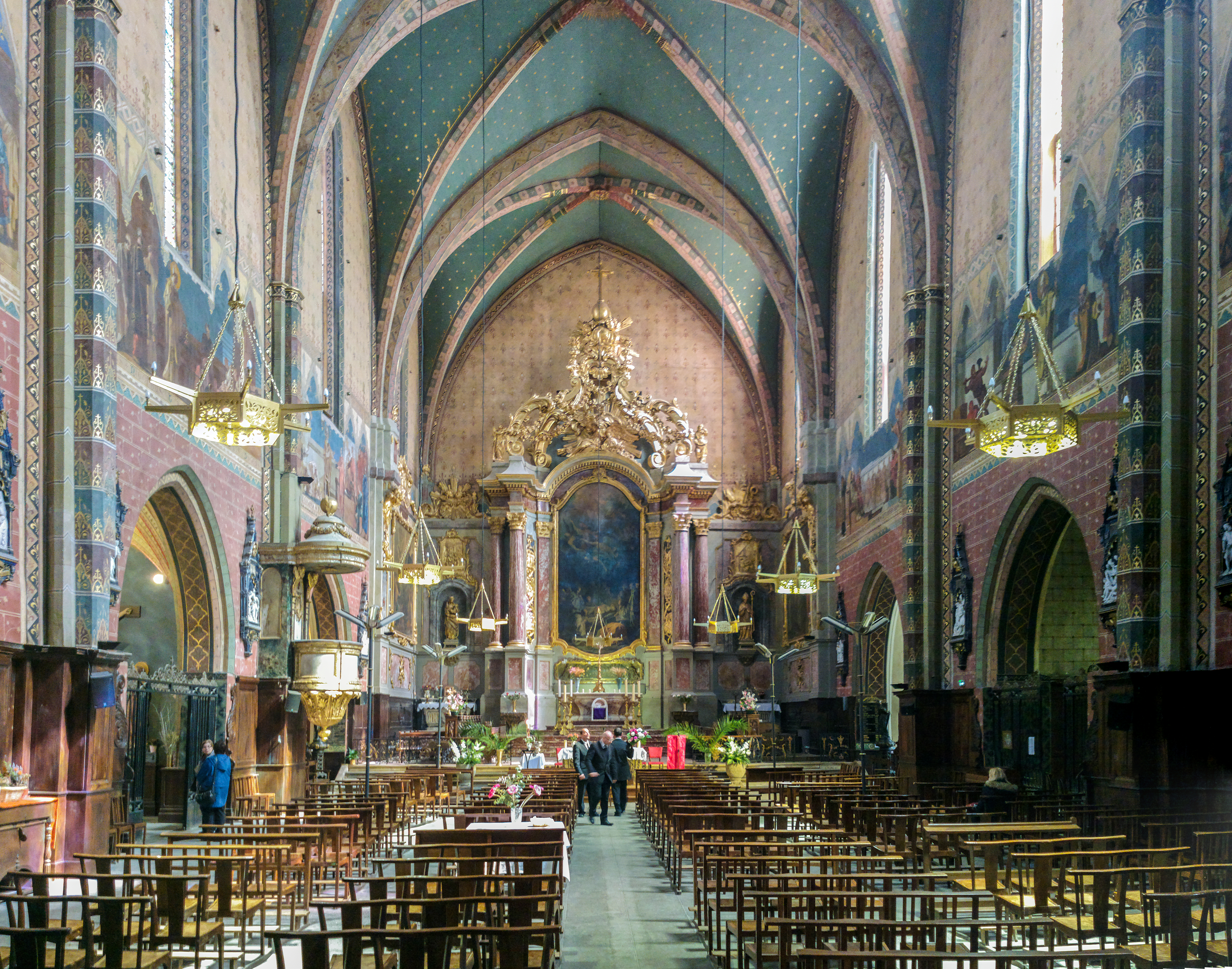
Interior

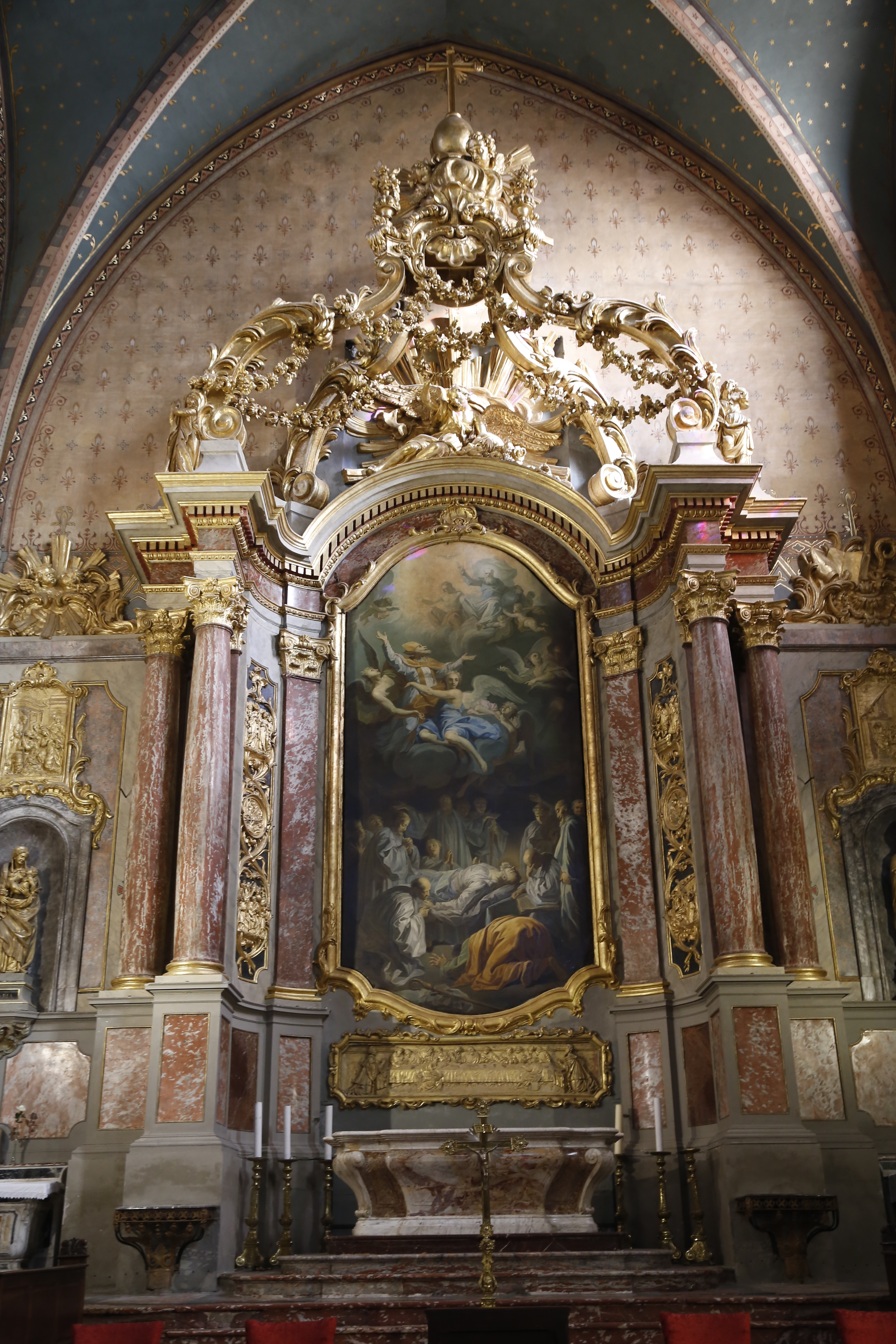
The altarpiece

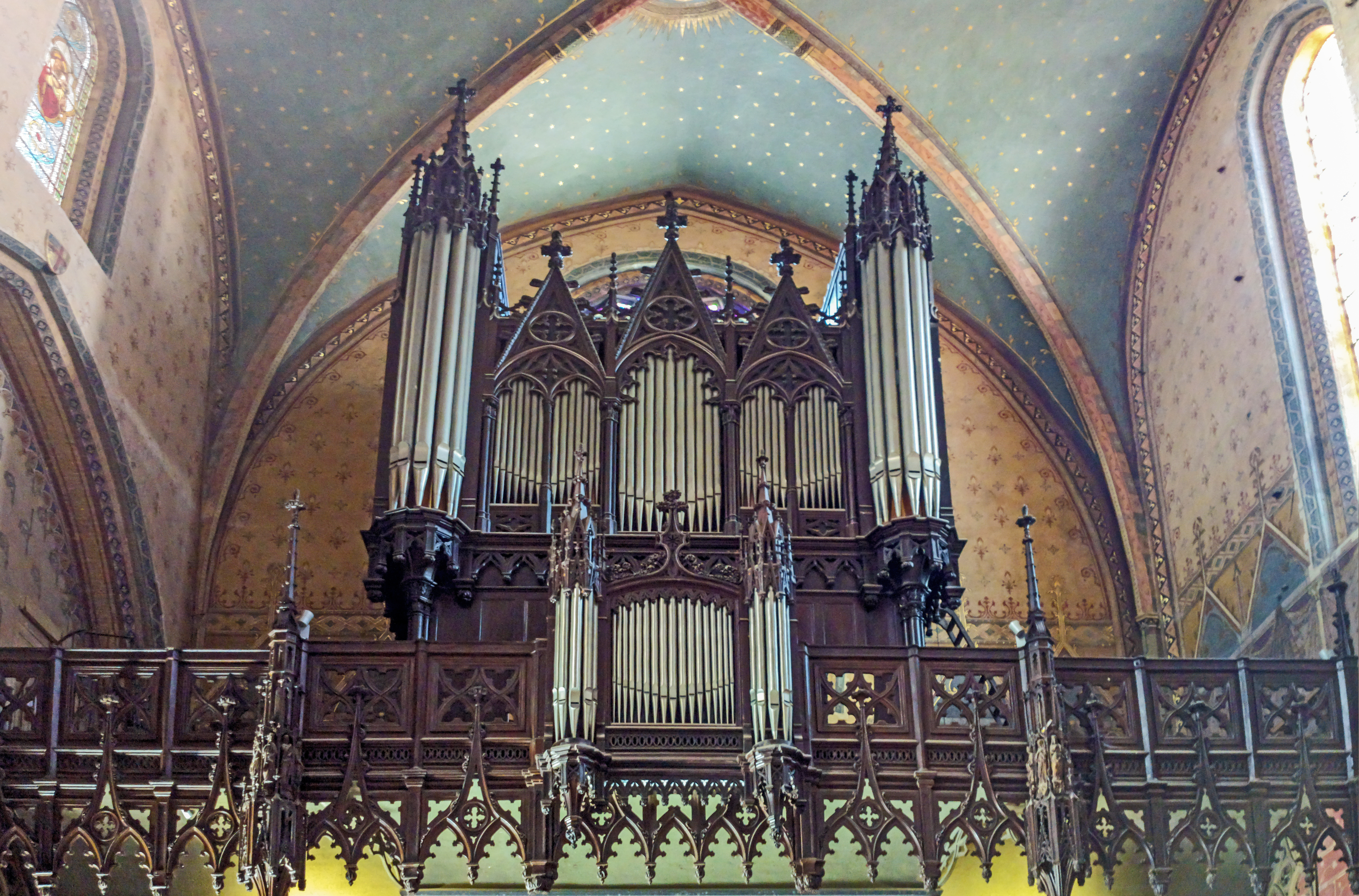
Organ
