= Old St. Nicholas Church, Focșani =

Heritage site in Vrancea County, Romania

Coordinates: 45°41′45″N 27°10′56″E

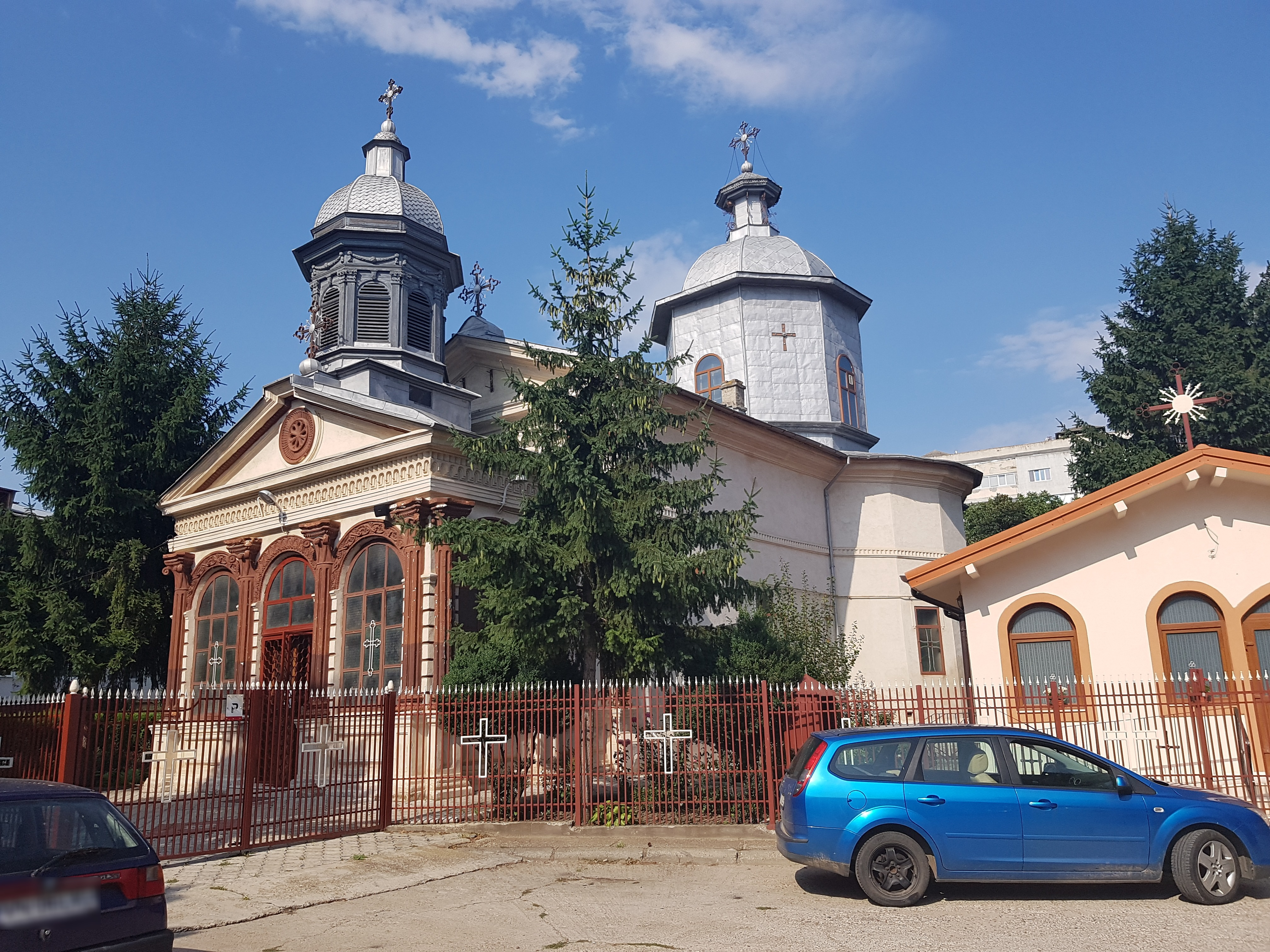
Old St. Nicholas Church

The Old St. Nicholas Church (Romanian: Biserica Sfântul Nicolae Vechi) is a Romanian Orthodox church located at 1 Cotești Street in Focșani, Romania. It is dedicated to Saint Nicholas.

The church was built between 1713 and 1716. It is listed as a historic monument by Romania's Ministry of Culture and Religious Affairs.
