= Church of St. Nicholas, Włocławek (1906–1925) =

Former Orthodox church in Włocławek, Poland

Coordinates: 52°39′00.0″N 19°03′00.0″E

Church of St. Nicholas
- Cerkiew św. Mikołaja
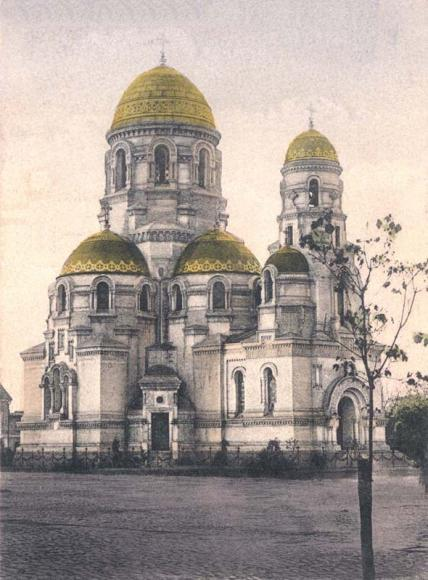
- Church on a postcard from 1912
- Church of St. Nicholas
- Location: Włocławek
- Country: Poland
- Denomination: Eastern Orthodoxy
- Churchmanship: Russian Orthodox Church

History
- Dedication: Saint Nicholas
- Dedicated: December 17, 1906

Architecture
- Architect(s): Jakunin, Roman Fijałkowski
- Style: Neo-Byzantine
- Years built: 1902–1906
- Closed: 1914
- Demolished: 1925

Specifications
- Materials: brick

Administration
- Diocese: Diocese of St. Nicholas in Włocławek

Church of St. Nicholas was an Orthodox church in Włocławek, built between 1902 and 1906, functioning until the Russians left the city in the first days of August 1914. It was temporarily occupied by the German army for military administration purposes and was completely abandoned after 1918. In 1920, there was a plan to adapt the church for use as a garrison church, but it was not carried out due to the building's significant deterioration. Ultimately, as a symbol of Russification policies, the church was demolished in 1925.

== Architecture ==
The church was built in the Neo-Byzantine style. The entrance led through a decorative portal and a church porch, above which rose a bell tower topped with a dome. The nave and the chancel were covered by a similarly shaped dome, flanked by smaller, analogous structures on the side walls. Each of the tholobates featured eight semicircular windows. The church was designed to accommodate up to 2,000 worshippers at a time.

In literature, it is described as one of the most beautiful Orthodox churches built by the Russians in the territory of Congress Poland.

== History ==
=== First church project ===
The establishment of an Orthodox parish and the construction of its temple in Włocławek were closely tied to the city's inclusion in the Russian Partition. The significant influx of Russian officials and soldiers, especially after 1836 when the district seat was moved to Włocławek, led the city authorities to set up a domestic chapel in a house on 12 Przedmiejska Street. Due to the growing number of Orthodox believers, a house on 6 Kopernik Street was purchased, and between 1850 and 1860, it was adapted and fully transformed into a church.

However, in 1859, a regiment of infantry, a cavalry regiment, police and gendarmerie commands, and the border guard headquarters stationed in Aleksandrów Pograniczny were located in Włocławek. All these institutions employed Orthodox Russians. In 1870, a committee was formed to seek permission to build a church in the area of the market square and public garden (today's Freedom Square).

In 1871, Konstanty Wojciechowski presented a project for the church, which was subsequently sent to St. Petersburg and positively reviewed. His plan included the removal of the market (the so-called New Market) and the creation of a green space with the church at the central point, at the junction of four main avenues. The church was designed to have a single nave built on a square plan, in the Romanesque Revival style, with a dome. The semicircular chancel was to face north. A lower church porch, covered with a smaller dome, was planned for the southern part of the church. Side exits were to be placed on both the eastern and western walls of the nave. However, this project was never realized, although, as Kirill Sokol and Alexander Sosna report, in 1875 the Russian State Treasury allocated 35,000 rubles for the project. According to R. Hankowska, the decision to abandon the original design was due to the proposed building resembling Catholic churches too closely.

=== Construction ===
The idea of building a freestanding Orthodox church in Włocławek was revived in 1902. A completely new design was prepared by architect Jakunin in collaboration with Roman Fijałkowski. The cornerstone for the construction was laid on 30 May 1902 on land provided free of charge by the authorities of Włocławek, in the location designated for the church since 1870. Construction work was carried out by workers brought in from the Chernihiv Governorate, with bricks for the project produced at a brickworks in Aleksandrów Kujawski. According to Sokoł and Sosna, the total cost of construction was covered by the Russian central authorities (25,000 rubles) and the city authorities (2,000 rubles). However, Hankowska cites a much higher amount – 67,611 rubles. The building was completed in 1906, and on 17 December of that year, it was consecrated.

As noted in a petition to the authorities of Włocławek after Poland regained independence, the church was built in the most frequented part of the city, obstructing the extension of 3 Maja Street (then called Nowa Street), and thus hindering the development of the southern districts. The author of the petition claimed that the church's location was protested by the inhabitants of Włocławek, as well as some municipal officials, including the district head, who was subsequently reassigned to a different post. The building was unequivocally regarded by the locals as a symbol of Russification. The parish's congregants were almost exclusively Russians, who made up 1.2% of the city's population.

=== Functioning of the church until 1920 ===
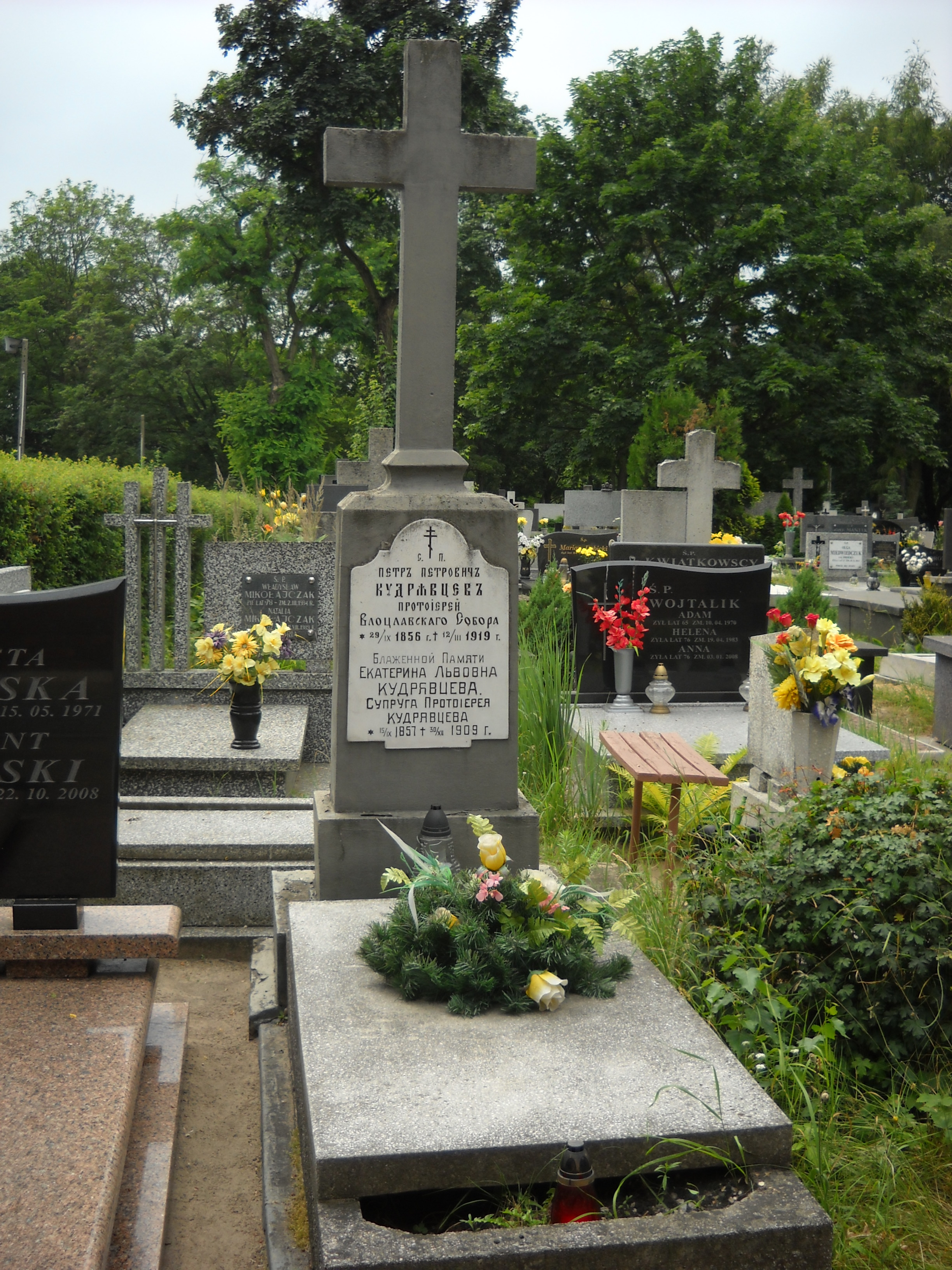
Grave of Archpriest Piotr Kudriawcew, who died in 1919, was the last parson in Włocławek, serving the pastoral work at the church located at today's Freedom Square. The tombstone mistakenly refers to the building as a cathedral

The Orthodox parish in Włocławek operated until August 1914, when the Russian residents of the city left for exile. The parson then closed the church building and ceased holding services, although he remained in his previous residence. When the German troops entered Włocławek, they took control of the inactive church for military purposes, and the bells were ordered to be melted down for use by the army.

In 1920, the municipal authorities handed over the church to the Włocławek garrison with the intention of adapting it into a military church. However, these plans were impossible to realize. A building commission, chaired by Antoni Olszakowski, assessed the technical condition of the building as very poor. The commission's report noted, among other things, that the windows were shattered, much of the plaster had fallen off, and the walls had become soaked with moisture, making the building at risk of collapse.

=== Demolition ===
Three years later, another commission, led by county architect Osterlof, concluded that the years of neglect had made the church liable to collapse at any moment. The same report also included a remark that the ruined building "offends national dignity with its appearance and causes impatience among the local population... as evidenced by last year's mysterious explosions that occurred inside the church".

The local press echoed a similar sentiment. Hankowska cites a journalistic comment as an example: "The inhabitants of Kuyavia and our town must continue to gaze upon the former power of the East, which has vanished irreversibly, yet the domes still rise to the heavens, as if mocking us".

The church was ultimately demolished in 1925. After its destruction, plans were made to connect 3 Maja Street with Kaliska Street, a connection that had previously been blocked by the church's structure. However, this project was never realized.

In 2006, the Orthodox bishop of Łódź and Poznań, Szymon, appealed to the authorities of Włocławek for compensation for the demolished church.

== Bibliography ==
- Hankowska, R. (1999). "Rozwój układu przestrzennego Włocławka od 1793 do 1918 roku" [The Spatial Development of Włocławek from 1793 to 1918]. In Staszewski, J. (ed.). Włocławek. Dzieje miasta [Włocławek: History of the City] (in Polish). Włocławek: Włocławskie Towarzystwo Naukowe. ISBN 83-88115-09-X.
