= St Nicholas Church, Stará Ľubovňa =

Roman Catholic church in Stará Ľubovňa, Slovakia

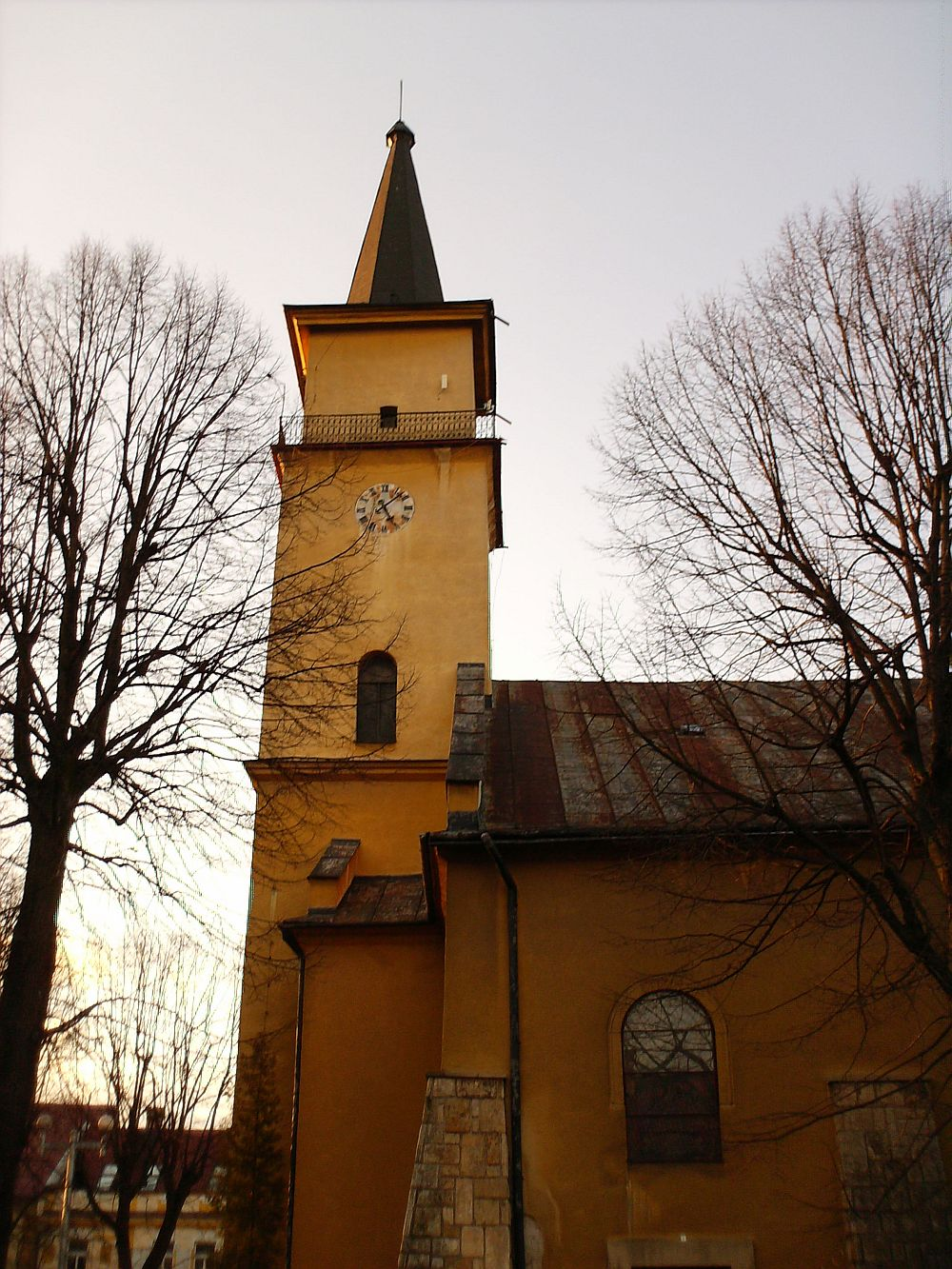
Coordinates:49°18′8.20″N 20°41′24.5″E

The Church of Saint Nichlaus, located in Stará Ľubovňa, is a Roman Catholic church dating from 1280.

There are several works of art in its baroque interior, including a late 13th century triumphal arch, late–Gothic stone font, the figure of the “Ľubovňa Madonna” dated 1360, the Gothic sacrament-house, and the late–Gothic tombstones.

Other historically valuable pieces are Baroque high altar to St Nicholas the Bishop, the side altars and a sculpture of the Mourning for Christ. Until 1780 there was a graveyard around the church. There are as-yet unexplored crypts beneath the church.
