= St. Nicholas Church, Halmstad =

Saint Nicholas Church
- Sankt Nikolai kyrka
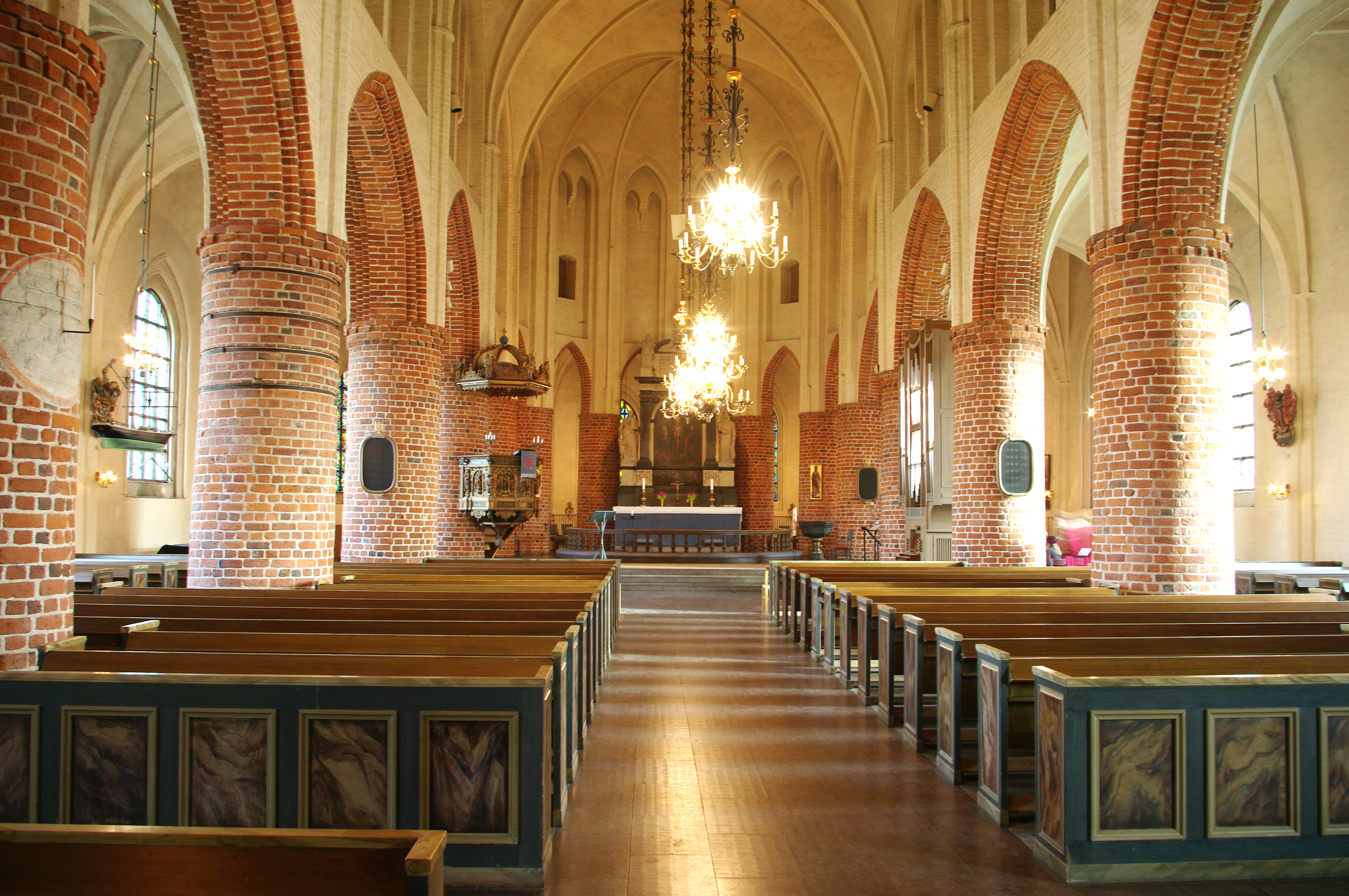
- Interior (2015)
- Saint Nicholas Church
- 56.6733°N 12.8564°E
- Location: Halmstad
- Address: Kyrkogatan 11, 302 42 Halmstad
- Country: Sweden
- Denomination: Church of Sweden

History
- Dedication: Saint Nicholas
- Consecrated: 14th century

The Saint Nicholas Church (Swedish: Sankt Nikolai kyrka) or the Nicholas Church (Swedish: Nikolaikyrkan) is a church building in central Halmstad, Sweden.
