= Tăbăcari Church =

Heritage site in Vrancea County, Romania

Coordinates: 45°41′42″N 27°10′24″E

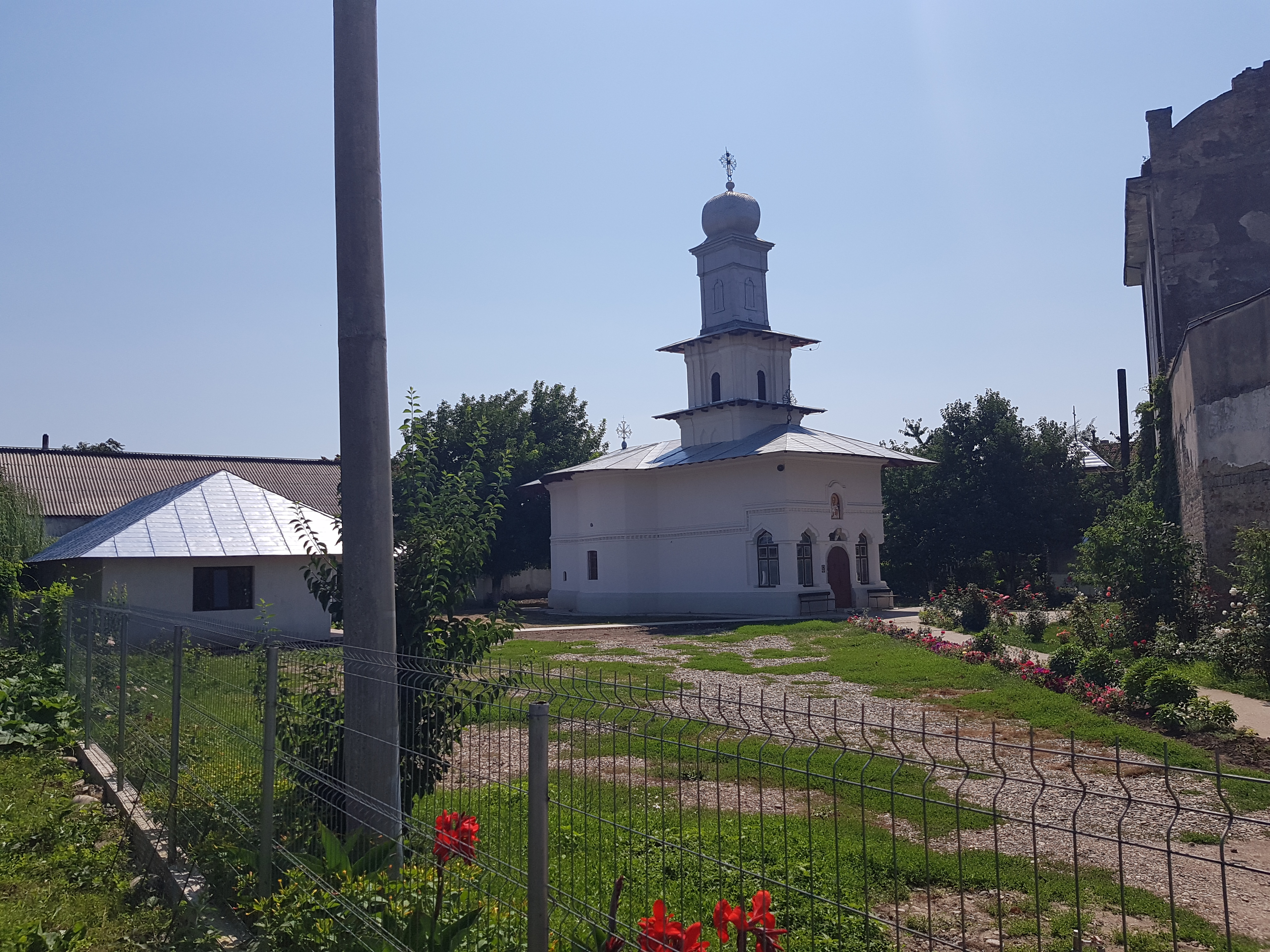
Tăbăcari Church

The Tăbăcari Church (Romanian: Biserica Sfântul Nicolae - Tăbăcari) is a Romanian Orthodox church located at 9 Ghioceilor Street in Focșani, Romania. It is dedicated to Saint Nicholas.

The church dates to the end of the 18th century. Its ktetors came from the guild of tanners (tăbăcari), who worked in the eponymous quarter.

Trefoil in shape, it has a porch that was originally open, a narthex, nave and altar. The porch has three-lobed arches supported by masonry columns. In the 19th century, the porch was walled in and given recessed windows. Also at that time, the bell tower on the narthex was rebuilt in the contemporary neoclassical style. The facades are divided into two horizontal registers by a brick row. The row is interrupted above the entrance, where a niche is painted with Saint Nicholas.

The church is listed as a historic monument by Romania's Ministry of Culture and Religious Affairs.
