= Stroe Church =

Heritage site in Vrancea County, Romania

Coordinates: 45°42′06″N 27°11′17″E

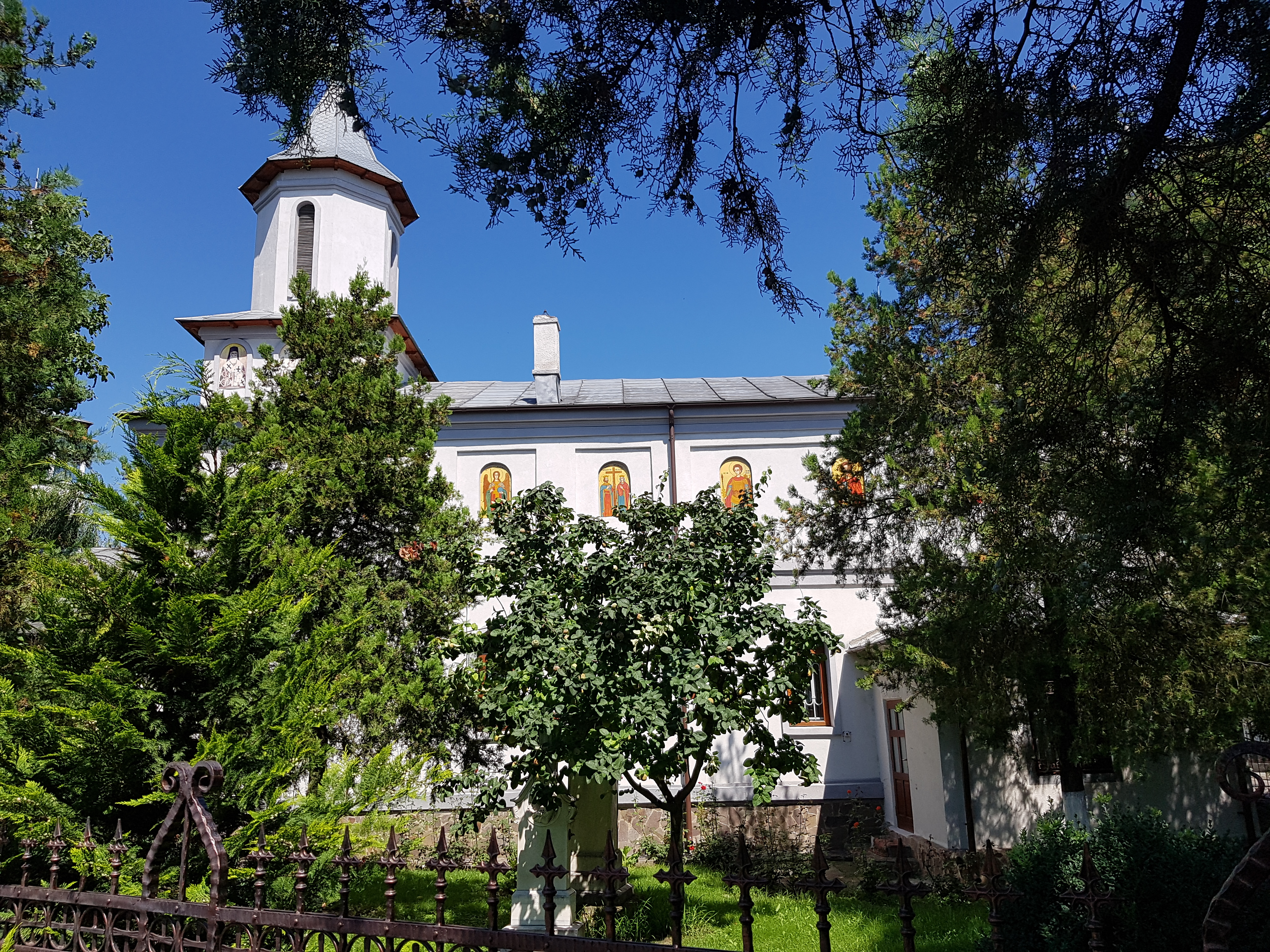
Stroe Church

The Stroe Church (Romanian: Biserica Sfântul Nicolae - Stroe) is a Romanian Orthodox church located at 13 Duiliu Zamfirescu Street in Focșani, Romania. It is dedicated to Saint Nicholas.

The church was built in 1839. It is listed as a historic monument by Romania's Ministry of Culture and Religious Affairs.
