= St. Nicholas Church, Kurjan =

Cultural Monument in Albania

Coordinates: 40.7152°N 19.7410°E

St. Nicholas Church
- Kisha e Shën Kollit (Albanian)
- Interactive map of St. Nicholas Church
- Location: Kurjan, Fier County, Albania

Site notes
- Governing body: DRKK Fier

Cultural Monument of Albania
- Type: Architectural
- Criteria: I
- Part of: January 15, 1963
- Reference no.: FR013

St. Nicholas Church is a cultural heritage monument in Kurjan, Fier County, Albania.

== History and description ==
The stone-cornered red brick church, dedicated to Saint Nicholas (Albanian: Shën Kollit), lies on a hill outside of town and dates to the 13th century under Byzantine rule. Including a nave and narthex, the church once featured a barrel vault typical of Orthodox buildings.

Over the centuries, the dome collapsed and was replaced by a wood-tile roof. Also gone are the main portico once on the western side as well as the smaller ones facing north and south, leaving only the foundations and some antique capitals of the Doric order. As is common in the Fier region, stones, columns, and inscriptions were taken from ancient ruins in Apollonia and elsewhere nearby to build the church. The floor is stone tile, and three apses remain, a large one facing east and two small ones facing north and south.

The arch over the southern gate shows Romanesque influence, courtesy of occupation by the Kingdom of Sicily from the 11th century to the 14th century. Influenced by the reburial of Saint Nicholas by Urso, the Archbishop of Bari Urso, in Bari in 1089 (after the destruction in 1034 of the church where he was buried in his hometown of Myra), the Normans built churches to him extensively including the one in Kurjan. Occupying Normans during the Byzantine–Norman wars extensively patronized the local churches, including Our Lady of Apollonia just 20 kilometres (12 mi) west of Kurjan, featuring a Romanesque portico dating to the time of Robert Guiscard.

In 1956, students from the University of Tirana discovered a 1576 fresco by icon painter Nikolla, son of Onufri, and his apprentice Joan. According to scholar Theofan Popa's 1999 work Mbishkrime të kishave të shqipërisë ("Inscriptions of the Churches of Albania"):

The text in Medieval Greek was a prayer to the parish priest: "When you raise your hands before God, priest, remember me with Joni and Nikolla."

The discovery earned the church its status as a cultural heritage monument in 1963. In Viktori Puzanova and Dhorka Dhamo's article, "Disa tipare të pikturës monumentale në Shqipëri gjatë shekujve XII-XV" ("Some features of monumental icons in Albania in the 12 to 14th centuries"), published in the second issue of Studime Historike in 1967, they wrote the following:

The early frescoes of the Kurjan church belong to the Byzantine style, but include some local elements. This is seen in elements such as the small proportions and ornamental motifs in the blessing of Mary of Egypt by Zosimas of Palestine.
