= The Man of Sorrows from the New Town Hall in Prague =

Painted polychrome wooden statue

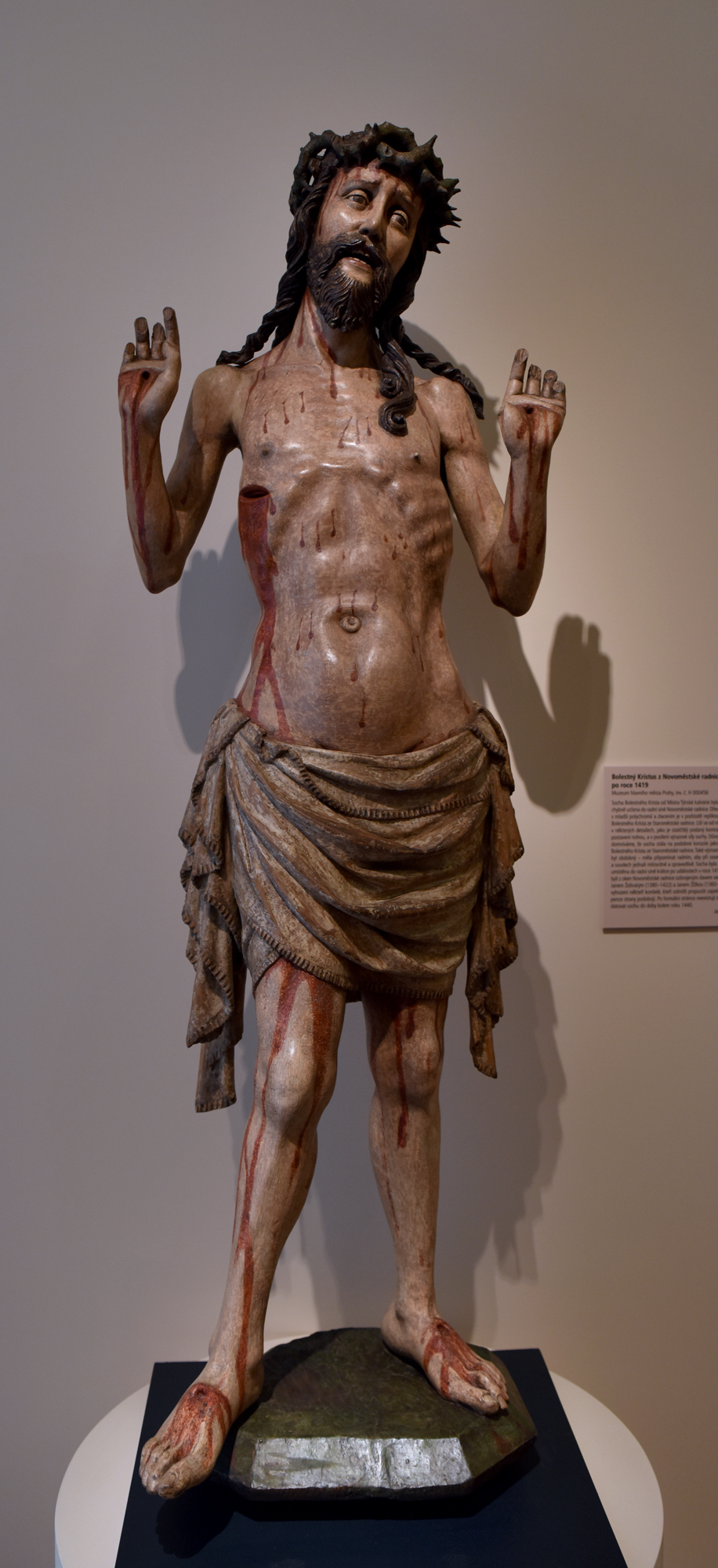
The Man of Sorrows from the New Town Hall in Prague (1403-1419)

The Man of Sorrows from the New Town Hall in Prague (1413-1419?) is a painted polychrome statue in wood, attributed to the Master of the Týn Calvary. The statues of the Man of Sorrows from the Old Town Hall and the New Town Hall in Prague are the oldest extant works of this type in the Czech lands. The statue in the Council Chamber of the New Town Hall survived the defenestration of councillors by radical Hussites in 1419. It is displayed in the historical exhibition of the City of Prague Museum.

The Man of Sorrows is the first monumental nude in Bohemian sculpture. It has a parallel in early 15th-century Bohemian panel painting – on a wing of the Roudnice Altarpiece (1410-1420). The New Town Hall Man of Sorrows draws on the tradition of court art, especially the sculpture of the International Gothic Beautiful Style and the contemporary panel paintings of the Master of the Třeboň Altarpiece, but its expressive strength surpasses the idealism of the highpoint of the Beautiful Style.

== Description and context ==
The statue, less than life-size, is sculpted in the round from limewood. The original polychrome painting has been preserved. It is 136 cm high (museum inventory no. 456).

The sculptor was so familiar with human anatomy that the statue stands comparison with contemporary Italian sculpture. However, it does not tend towards the order of Antiquity nor towards loveliness, and the individual parts of the statue are not connected into a single organic whole. The overall conception is subordinated to truthfulness of expression, for the sculpture was intended for the Council chamber as a symbol of justice. The New Town Hall Man of Sorrows does not adopt all the aspects of its formal model – the Man of Sorrows in the Prague Old Town Hall – but interprets it in a new way. It differs especially in the more robust figure and the more rigorous modelling, in the expression of the face, and in the anatomical structure of the chest. In his expressive approach and the spiritual and formal impact on the viewer, the sculptor anticipates several Late Gothic artistic principles.

In comparison with the Old Town Hall statue, the frontal stance is disturbed by a slight rotational movement and turning of the body away from the right leg, which is thrust forward. The sculpture was evidently not positioned on a socle high up, because there is less emphasis on counterpoise; the figure is upright, leans slightly back, and is looking to the front. The locks of hair are spread out over the shoulders and have a decorative effect. The sculptor balances in virtuoso fashion on the borderline between the Beautiful Style and the new artistic approach emphasising states of emotional tension. Christ’s half-open mouth corresponds to the gesture of his hands, expressing the ancient Christian manner of praying and interceding.

In comparison with the sculpture’s model, the perizoma is less segmented, and on the right side in front it has the minor motif of a pleat, which is not found in other works by the Master of the Týn Calvary. On the rear side of the statue, the carving of the garment and the hair has been simplified. The heightened expression as compared to the older work of the Master of the Týn Calvary is similar to that of the Crucifixion in Svatý Jan pod Skalou (ca. 1410) in comparison with the prototype Crucifix (1390-1400) from St Vitus’ Cathedral or the Crucified Christ from the Týn Church.

The statue was accompanied in the Council Chamber by the inscription Ecce homo. Christus confessum licet omni crimine Pressum, Ex omni hora suscipit absque mora. The statue was created in connection with the general renovation of the Council Chamber in the New Town Hall described by Tomek. In the archives of the New Town Hall a record has been preserved that in 1413 the painter Nicholas received 30 groschen for painting work. Albert Kutal deduced from this that the painter was also the sculptor and this could be a payment for polychroming the sculpture of the Man of Sorrows. This would put the date of the statue back to before 1413.

The location of the statue of the Man of Sorrows in the Council Chamber is connected with Saxon law that was in force at that time, and which laid down that the Council Chamber and adjoining chapel should be decorated with the theme of the Last Judgement. In this case, the statue represents the apocalyptic judge at the Last Judgement. At the same time, it fulfilled the requirement of the Utraquists for Eucharistic iconography that both the body and blood of Christ should be depicted, and so it was spared during the later iconoclastic riots.

The theme of the Man of Sorrows appeared in Bohemia in wall paintings and manuscript illuminations from the mid-14th century. It was also in Bohemia that the representation of the Eucharistic Man of Sorrows with a chalice and a host had its origin, for example in the stained-glass windows of the Church of all Saints in Slivenec (ca. 1370), in mural paintings (Church of St Margaret in Loukov, 1390), and in manuscript illuminations (Opatovice Breviary, 1380s). Close analogies with the sculptures of the Man of Sorrows in Prague can be found in statues on the same theme, in the Singer Gate in St Stephen’s Cathedral in Vienna (last quarter of the 14th century), or from a later period the stone statue in the Church of St Dorothy in Wroclaw (1430) and the well-known Man of Sorrows by Hans Multscher from the Ulm Minster (1429).

=== Restorations ===
The sculpture has been restored by Bohuslav Slánský (1947), Jan Živný and Jitka Musilová (1995), Jitka Bílá (2006), and Milan Kadavý (2015). During the most recent restoration Ivana Kopecká carried out material analyses. During them, it was discovered that the composition of the pigments was identical for both statues of the Man of Sorrows – organic colouring-matter from dyer's alkanet and cochineal for the skin colouring, vermilion, lac dye, and madder for the bloodstains, and lead white, chalk, and linseed oil on the perizoma.

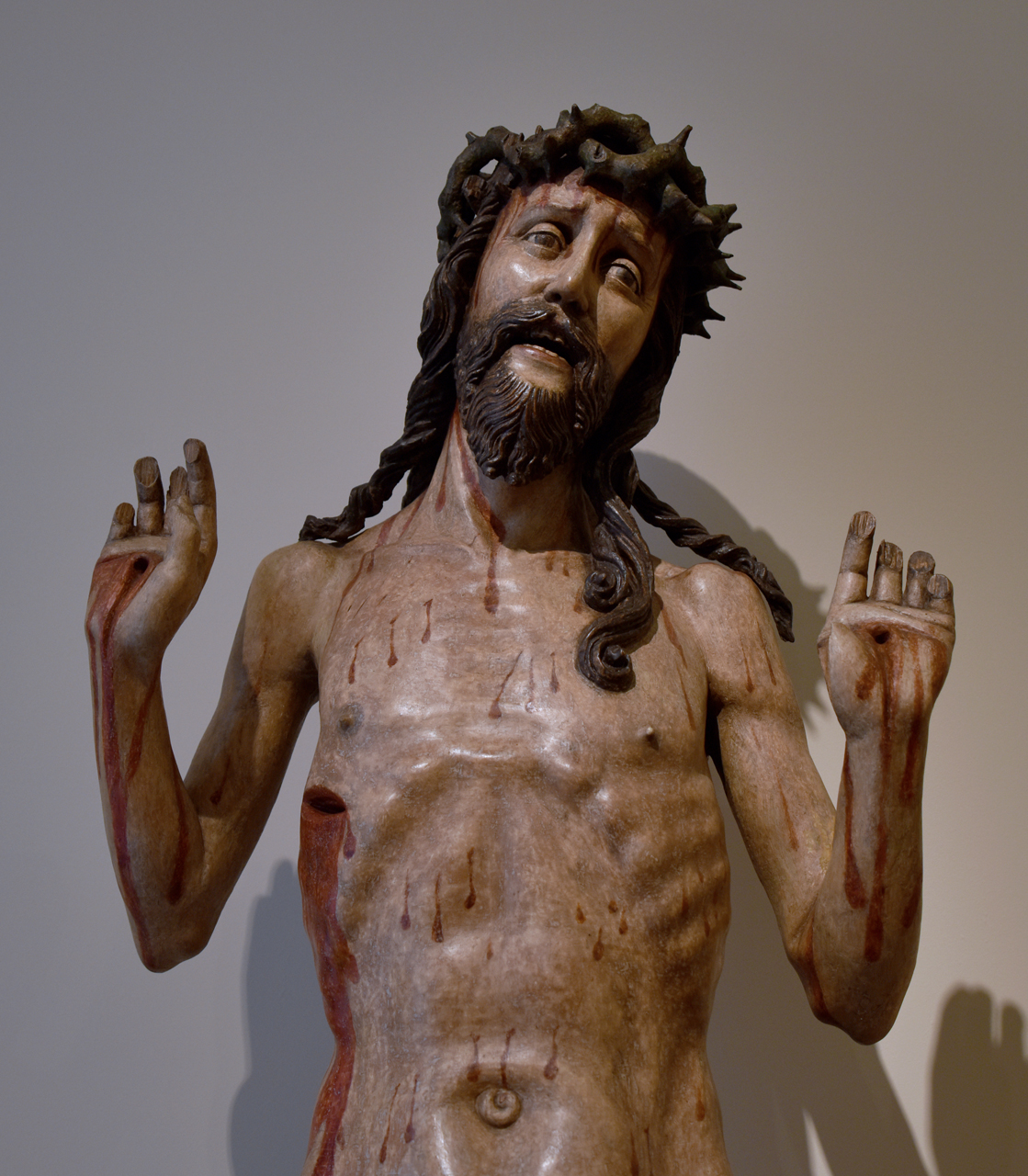
The Man of Sorrows from the New Town Hall in Prague, detail

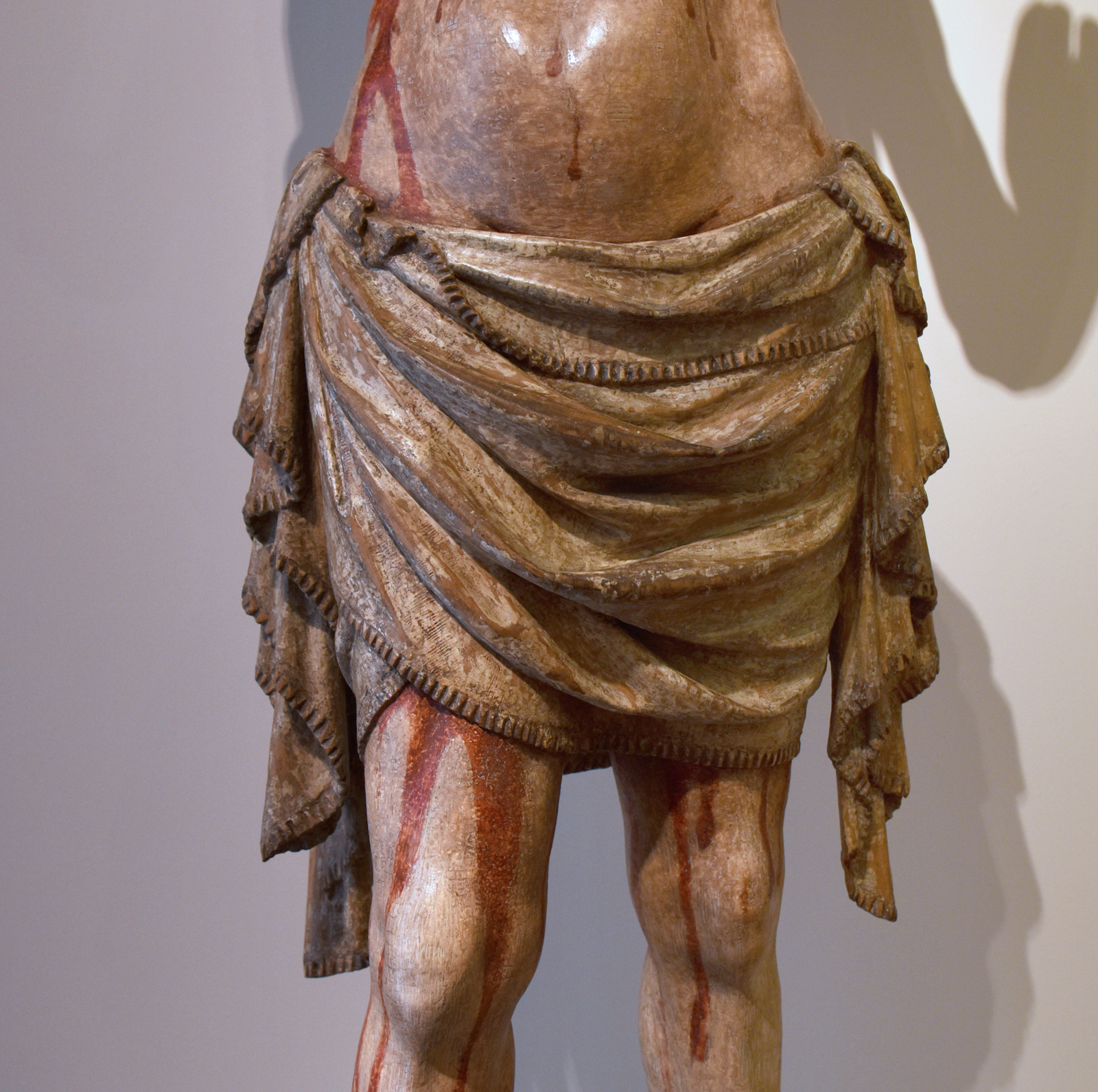
The Man of Sorrows from the New Town Hall in Prague, detail of perizoma

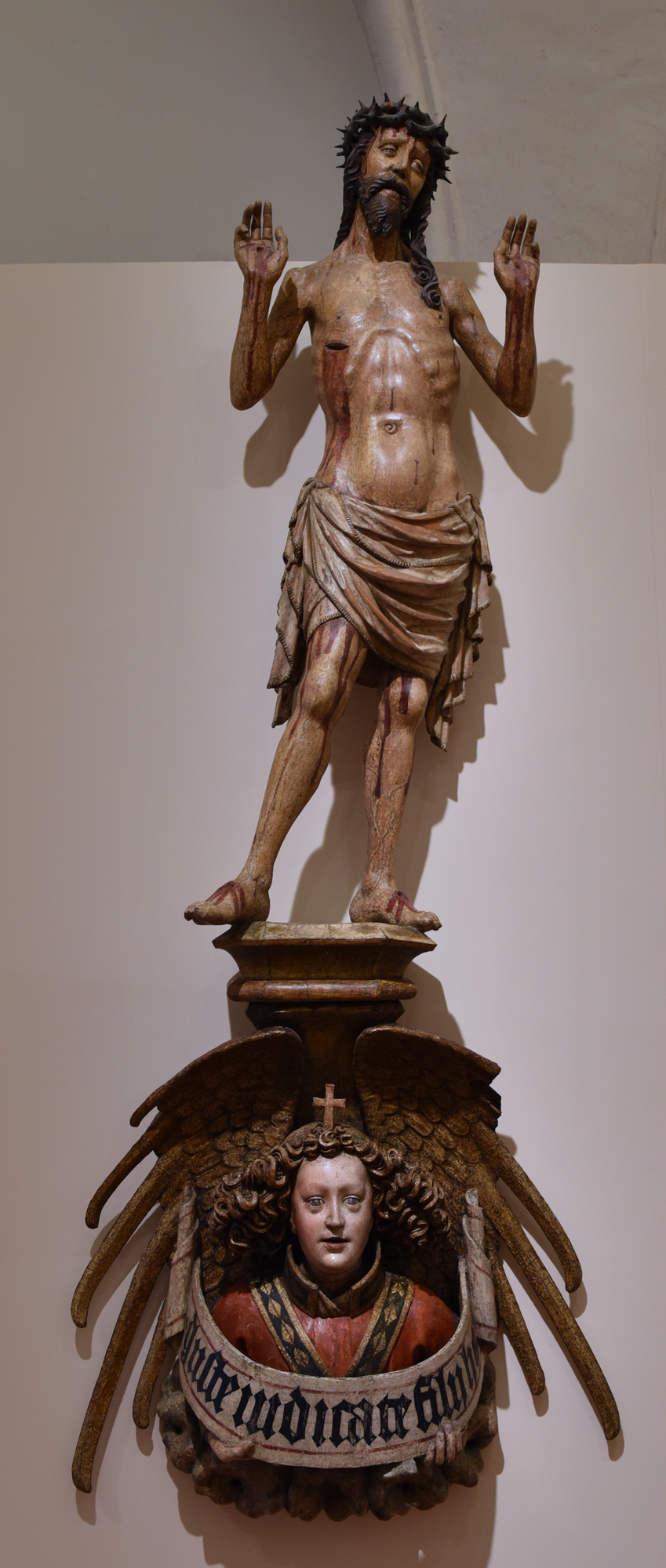
The Man of Sorrows from the Old Town Hall in Prague (after 1400)

=== Exhibitions ===
- 1957 L ´art ancien en Tchécoslovaquie, Paris
- 1966 Les Primitifs de Bohême, L´art gothique en Tchécoslovaquie 1350–1420, Brusel, Rotterdam
- 2015–2016 Prague of Jan Hus and hussites/ 1415–2015, City Gallery Prague, Clam-Gallas Palace
- 2019 Czech and Rome King Wenceslaus IV of Bohemia, Imperial stables, Prague Castle
- permanent exposition, City of Prague Museum

== Sources ==
- Kateřina Bartuňková, Mistr Týnské kalvárie, bachelor's work, FF UK, UDU Praha 2017
- Homolka Jaromír, Chlíbec Jan, Šteflová Milena: Mistr Týnské kalvárie, katalog výstavy NG, Praha 1990
- Albert Kutal, České gotické umění, Obelisk Praha 1972¨
- Albert Kutal, Sochařství, in: Kavka F (ed.), České umění gotické 1350–1420, Academia, Praha 1970
- Albert Kutal, České gotické sochařství 1350–1450, SNKLU, Praha, 1962
