= St. Nicholas Church, Râșnov =

Heritage site in Braşov County, Romania

Coordinates: 45°35′01″N 25°27′48″E

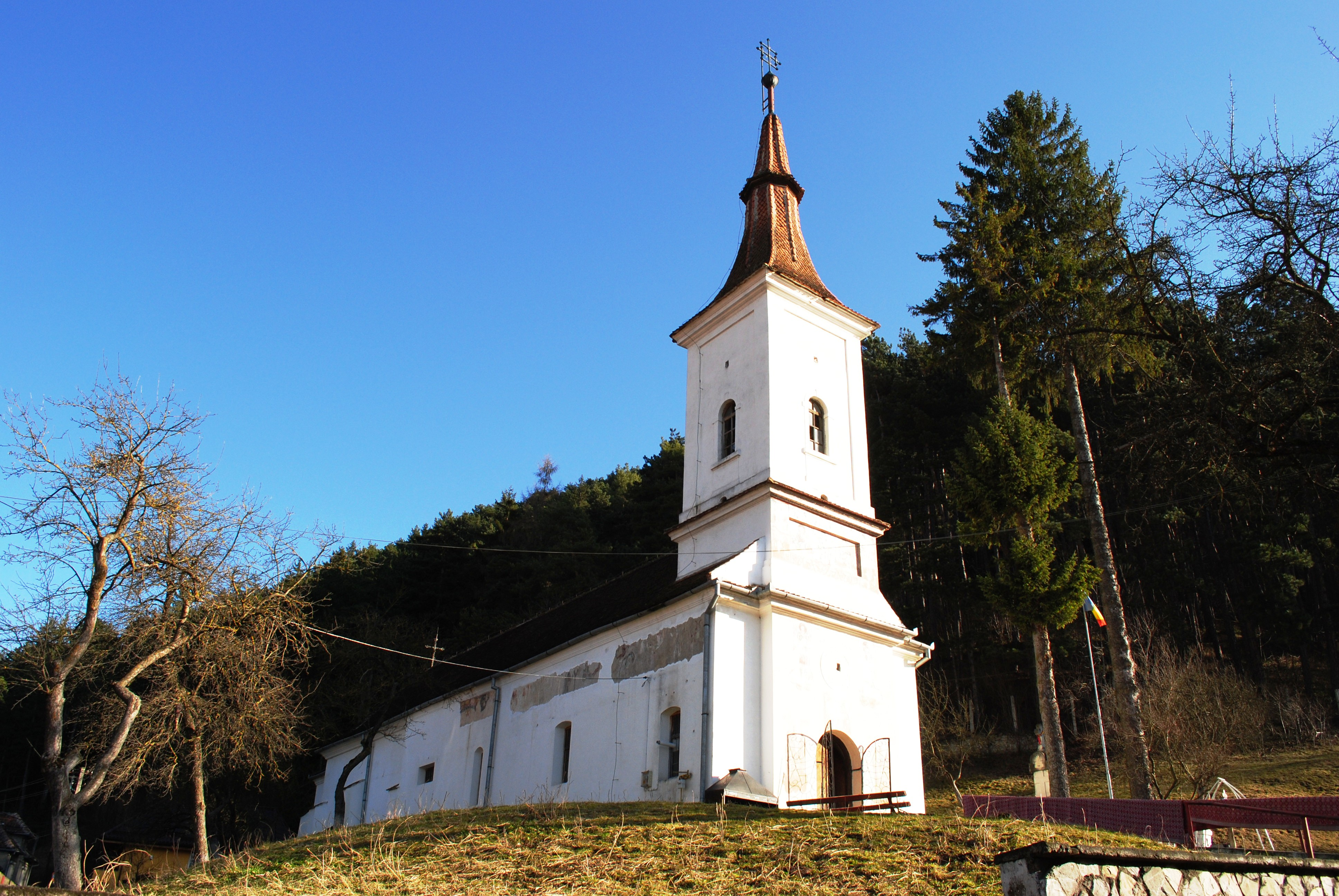
St. Nicholas Church

St. Nicholas Church (Romanian: Biserica Sfântul Nicolae) is a Romanian Orthodox church located at 14 Romulus Cristoloveanu Street, Râșnov, Brașov County, Romania. It is dedicated to Saint Nicholas.

== History and description ==
The oldest Orthodox church in Râșnov, it was the first church established by the House of Basarab in Transylvania. Located in the southeastern part of the town, it stands above the historically Romanian neighborhood of Pe Dobrice. A small Gothic structure traditionally dated to 1384, it received a new nave ceiling around 1500. It was later expanded horizontally and painted with murals, in several stages. A westward expansion took place before 1773. In 1823, a date written on the facade, work was completed and the church by and large assumed its present rectangular shape, with a polygonal apse to the east and a westerly bell tower. Successive paintings took place before World War I.

The oldest part of the church is the altar apse and the original nave, with walls built of raw quarried stones, held together by limestone mortar. The apse ceiling is made of curved panels fitting into a semi-cylinder. On the exterior, the ceilings are supported by buttresses. The altar has narrow rectangular windows on the north and south. The 1384 date for this section comes from a carving in the stone iconostasis installed several centuries later and mentioned in a 1773 document. The nave was later given a brick ceiling with cross-shaped pointed arches. One corbel features a heraldic coat of arms characteristic of the Western Late Middle Ages, allowing for an approximate date of 1500, through comparison with the nearest model, the Transylvanian Saxon St. Matthias Church. Except for the red crosses above the apse windows, the church lacked decoration for centuries.

In the early 18th century, the interior was entirely painted and the iconostasis set up. The 1773 document was written by two Brașov merchants, and mentions a renovation. The western wall of the Gothic nave was demolished, while the interior space was expanded with a bay that had a semi-cylindrical ceiling. A Last Judgment, fragments of which survive, was painted on the exterior. A new expansion was completed in 1823, when the narthex and current bell tower were built on the west, in neoclassical style. The narthex and nave are separated by a wall with three arches, the middle one considerably larger than the others.

== Painting ==
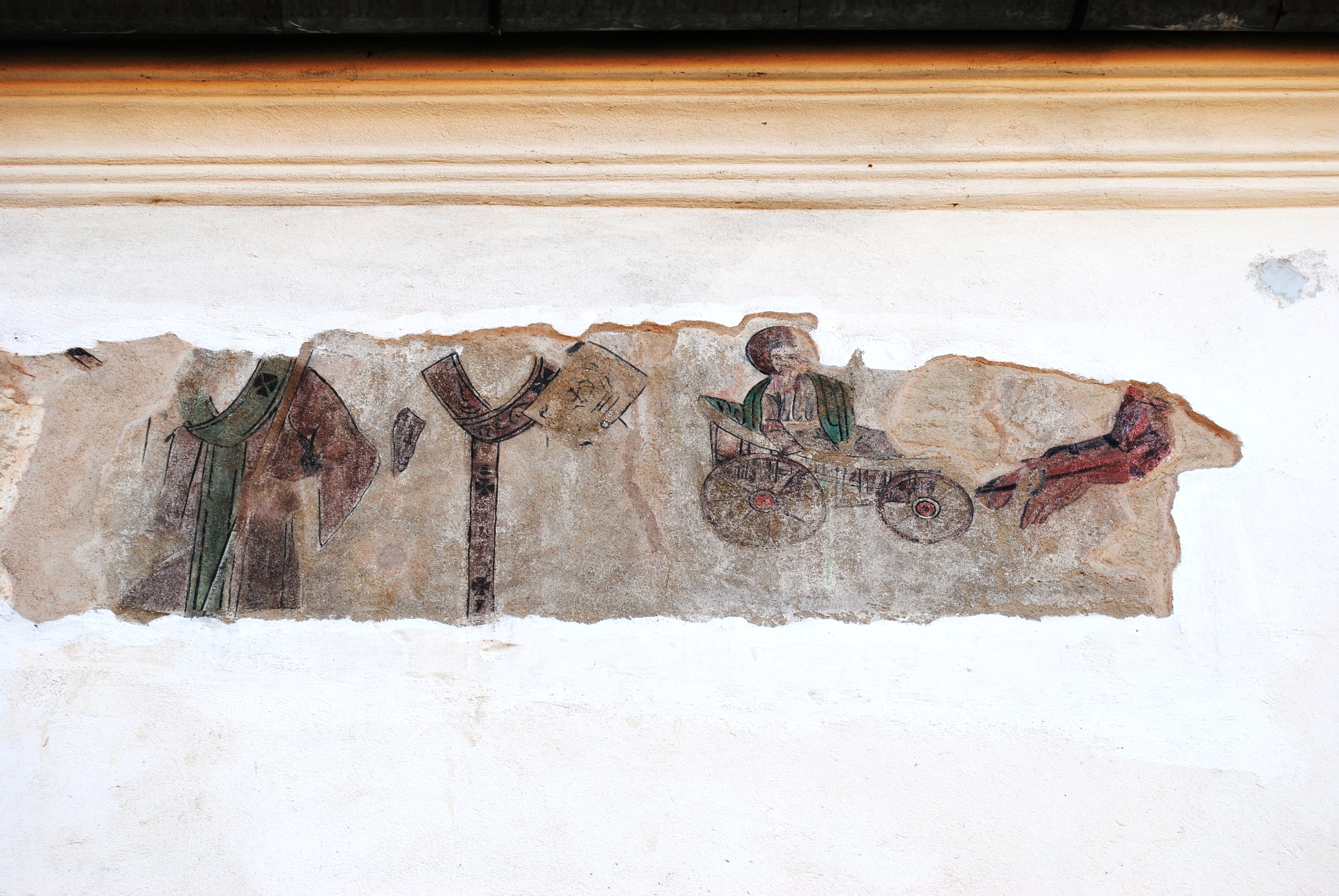
Fresco at St. Nicholas Church

Based on their style, technique and layers, researchers believe that the painting was carried out in three phases: fresco, partly preserved in the Gothic portion, the apse and east bay of the nave (early 18th century); fragments of exterior fresco, on the north wall of the nave extension nu the secco portion of the new interior nave bay (1773); narthex and exterior, west and north faces of the bell tower (1823).

=== Original ===
Of the original painting, there is preserved inside the altar only the image of Jesus in the tomb, the Man of Sorrows wept over by the Virgin Mary and Saint John the Evangelist, as well as small fragments on the south. There is a short inscription under the north window, in Romanian Cyrillic. The early frescoes originally covered the nave, but have been almost entirely lost due to poor adherence and seismic activity. The vaults feature images of the heavenly church, while the walls depict the earthly church.

The Gothic nave, atypical for an Orthodox church, has an image of Christ Pantocrator in a circular medallion edged by an inscription of which traces survive, and two groups of cherubim and seraphim. Ten figures of prophets survive; identifiable are Zechariah and Jonah on the east, Solomon, Habakkuk, David and John the Baptist on the west. Triangles near the Pantocrator encompass the Four Evangelists with their canonical symbols: Matthew with an angel, Luke with a bull, Mark with a lion, while John is shown in a cave with his disciple Prochorus. Smaller westerly medallions used to show the Twelve Apostles; only Thaddeus remains. Scenes and miracles from the life of Jesus appear: the Resurrection (southeast), the Confession of St. Thomas and the Myrrh-bearing women (southwest), the Samaritan woman and the blind man (northeast). Other episodes have disappeared from the side walls, except the Resurrection of Lazarus on the south. The paintings are in the Brâncovenesc style of the early 18th century, when artists from Horezu Monastery worked in Transylvania. A relevant model is St. Nicholas Church in Făgăraș.

=== Subsequent ===
The exterior Last Judgment dates to before 1773, and belongs to the post-Brâncovenesc style common to the painters then widely active in Țara Bârsei. In the interior, another team painted the new part of the nave in secco. The style fits in with the late Baroque then in vogue in Transylvanian mural art, the sparkling palette dominated by vermillion, yellow and green, on light backgrounds, with savvy architecture and details drawn from contemporary society, for example the costumes of the soldiers at the Passion of Christ. Among the depictions are the prophets in medallions, the eye of God surrounded by leaves, the Archangel Michael in circular frame, surrounded by St. Joseph and the angel, the Flight into Egypt, Luke the Evangelist painting the Madonna and Child, and the Baptism of Jesus. Jesus in the Temple and the Resurrection of Lazarus are also shown, as well as the Four Evangelists seated, writing. The rest of the vault is devoted to the Passion of Christ, in eight scenes of equal size: the Last Supper, the Prayer in the Garden of Gethsemane, the Betrayal of Judas, the Judgment of Annas, the Judgment of Caiaphas, the Judgment of Pilate, the Mocking, the Whipping. An adjacent area shows the Bearing of the Cross and the Crucifixion (south), the Mourning and Resurrection (north). The western nave wall depicts the Dormition of the Theotokos, flanked by the disciples arriving on clouds. The side walls show saints, of which Christopher and Marina are identifiable.

The narthex art resembles that of the bell tower, from 1823. It is in a folk style, with black contours and a restricted palette, dominated by green and red on a gray background, recalling the look of glass icons. Jesus appears enthroned between Mary and John the Baptist. On the sides, Saints Joachim and Anna are depicted in medallions. Above the two columns, there are busts of saints in rectangular frames; only the northerly image of Saint Nicholas survives. Another Dormition scene is painted on the western wall. On the bell tower, Saints Peter and Paul are depicted below the Virgin Mary, who is surrounded by a rectangular frame. Higher up is the date (1823), the Archangel Michael with a sword and the Archangel Gabriel with a lily. Saint Nicholas is also depicted at the base of the tower, enthroned between Mary and Jesus. In turn, they are surrounded by the Twelve Minor Prophets in circular medallions, holding mostly obliterated scrolls. The Four Evangelists are in the corners. Other saints done by the 1823 painter are on the north wall, but can only be identified with difficulty today.

The church is listed as a historic monument by Romania's Ministry of Culture and Religious Affairs.
