= Roudnice Altarpiece =

15th-century artwork

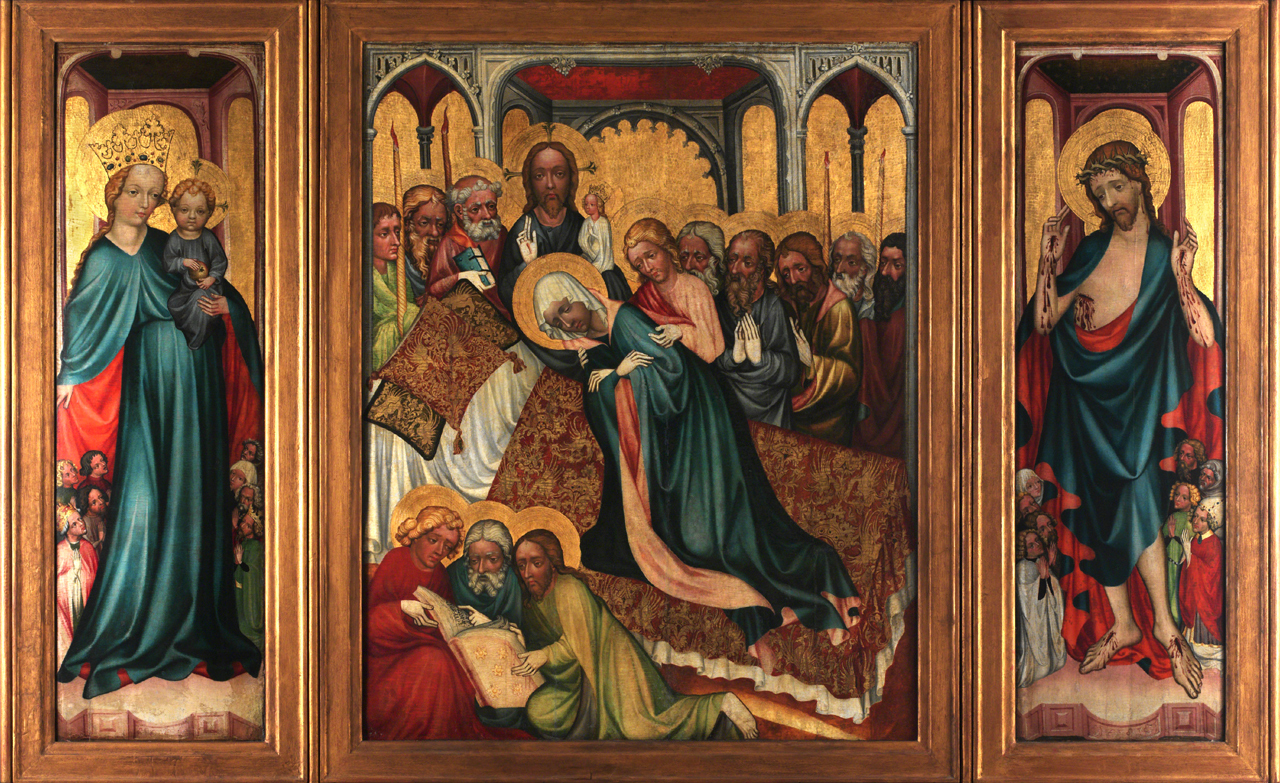
Roudnice Altarpiece (1410–1420), National Gallery Prague

The Roudnice Altarpiece is a three-part winged altar from the provost's church in Roudnice nad Labem, one of the oldest completely preserved Gothic retables from the period around 1410–1420. It is on display in the permanent exhibition of the National Gallery in Prague.

== History ==
The Roudnice triptych with the Death of the Virgin Mary was probably intended for the monastery church of the Nativity of the Virgin Mary of the Augustinian Canons in Roudnice nad Labem. It survived the sack of the monastery by Jan Žižka's army in 1421. However, it is also possible that it was made in Prague for an educated burgher and did not reach Roudnice until after the Hussite Wars. It was found in the Roudnice church in the form of separately hanging panels and was first mentioned in the 19th century by J. E. Wocel. In 1928 it was purchased for the Picture Gallery of the Society of Patriotic Friends of Art and restored for exhibition purposes.

Karel Chytil (1906) has determined the panels as parts of one altarpiece. He also identified the king kneeling at the feet of the Virgin Mary with Wenceslaus IV and dated the painting to the last decade of the 14th century.

The modern detailed technological research shows that the altar was created before the outbreak of the Hussite Wars and is thus probably the oldest completely preserved Czech wing altar after the altar from Mühlhausen and the small altarpiece—the so-called Cibulka triptych.

== Description and classification ==
The three parts of the altar are painted in tempera on a chalk ground, on lime wood panels. The central panel is covered with linen, the outer wings with a chalk ground on wood, the framing is non-original. The central panel measures 147 x 118.5 cm, the wings of the same height are 45 cm wide (with the original frame surviving to the 19th century they were 75 cm wide). The underdrawing is both brush and engraved; linseed oil was also used as a binder for the coloured glazes.

The central scene with the Death of the Virgin Mary is an example of the so-called Good Death, and the composition later spread from Bohemia to neighbouring countries. It depicts Mary kneeling on her bed during her last prayer, accompanied by the Apostles, led by St. Peter. In front is a group of three kneeling apostles with a book. The richly decorated bedspread with a brocade pattern on a gilded ground links the work to the Nuremberg painting. The background is gilded, with Gothic architecture in the upper part.

On the left wing is the Madonna Protectress with a crown on her head and an open blue protective cloak, under which groups of four supplicants kneel on each side. In the foreground on the left is the Pope with a tiara, on the right the King with a crown in period dress (probably Wenceslaus IV) and behind them representatives of various estates. It is clear that the commissioner came from a Catholic (not Reformed) background.

The right wing depicts the Sorrowful Christ with exposed wounds, also with a protective cloak, under which eight supplicants are hiding. In the foreground a young bishop in a pluvial and mitre kneels on the right, and on the left a young canon wearing an alb that resembles a Premonstratensian or Augustinian habit. The motif of Christ the Protector is quite unique and, apart from one illumination and one mural in South Tyrol, has no iconographic equivalent.

The back of the wings depict Sorrowful Christ with a loincloth and the insignia of the Passion, and the Sorrowful Virgin Mary with a white veil on her head. At the bottom of both paintings are kneeling figures of unknown donors—on the right a burgher with four sons, on the left his wife with four daughters. The paintings on the back of the altar are probably the work of a younger assistant. They are characterised by a more expressive colouring and greater drama in their depiction of the state of mind and physical suffering that is typical of the next period of Gothic painting.

The Roudnice Altarpiece is one of the most important monuments of Czech painting of the late Gothic style. It displays a considerable formalism in the organisation of the composition and drapery and a settled typology of faces. In terms of style and time, it is closest to the so-called Capuchin cycle, the Ambras sketchbook with busts of saints and representatives of individual estates (1410–1412) or the drawing of St. John the Evangelist in Brno City Archive. Among book paintings, the closest to him in terms of typical faces and drapery modelling are the canon sheet of the Hassembourg Missal (1409), the Gelnhausen Codex of Jihlava, the Vienna Missal (after 1411) and the Mettgen Bible of the Poor (1414–1415).

The stylization, disfigurement and flat layout of the figures, the solemn and ceremonial conception of the scene, the decorativeness and the abundant use of gilding and ornaments are related to the ecclesiastically representative function of the painting. The depiction of Christ in the scene of the Death of the Virgin Mary (Veraikon type) is characteristic of the Byzantinizing tendencies of Bohemian painting in the late period of the Beautiful style. The figure of the Virgin Mary with the clothed Child Jesus and the depiction of the cheeks recall the older style of painting from the circle of Master Theodoric.

An unusual element, which corresponds to the exacerbated religiosity of the pre-Hussite period, or is related to the plague epidemics (1414, 1439), is the double motif of intercession—the Madonna Protectress together with the Sorrowful Christ as the Protector on the altar wings. The transfer of reverence from the Virgin Mary also to Christ corresponds to the demands of Hussite reform theology. The primary function of the altar, which was closed for most of the year, was as an epitaph for the donor's family with eight children.

=== Related works ===
- The Capuchin Cycle
- Madonna of Svojšín
- Madonna of the Zlatá Koruna monastery

== Sources ==
- Jan Klípa, Adam Pokorný, Jana Sanyová, TRIPTYCH SE SMRTÍ PANNY MARIE, ZVANÝ ROUDNICKÝ OLTÁŘ Notes on the technique of painting and the art historical context, The Story of Art - Transformations of Art in Time. The Story of Art - Artwork Changes in Time, eds. David Hradil, Janka Hradilová, Acta Artis Academica, Prague 2010, ISBN 978-80-87108-14-7, pp. 189–226 Available online.
- Jan Klípa, Ymago de Praga. Panel Painting in Central Europe 1400–1430, Prague 2012, ISBN 978-80-7035-502-2
- Fajt J., Chlumská Š., Bohemia and Central Europe 1220–1550, National Gallery in Prague 2014, ISBN 978-80-7035-569-5, pp. 57–58
- Jaroslav Pešina, Czech Gothic panel painting, Odeon, Prague 1976, p. 52
- Albert Kutal, Czech Gothic Art, Artia/Obelisk Prague 1972, p. 130
- Jaroslav Pešina, Panel Painting in: Czech Gothic Art 1350–1420, Academia Prague 1970, p. 238
- Antonín Matějček, Jaroslav Pešina, Czech Gothic Painting, Melantrich, Prague 1950, pp.128–131
