= Man of Sorrows (Christus) =

Painting by Petrus Christus

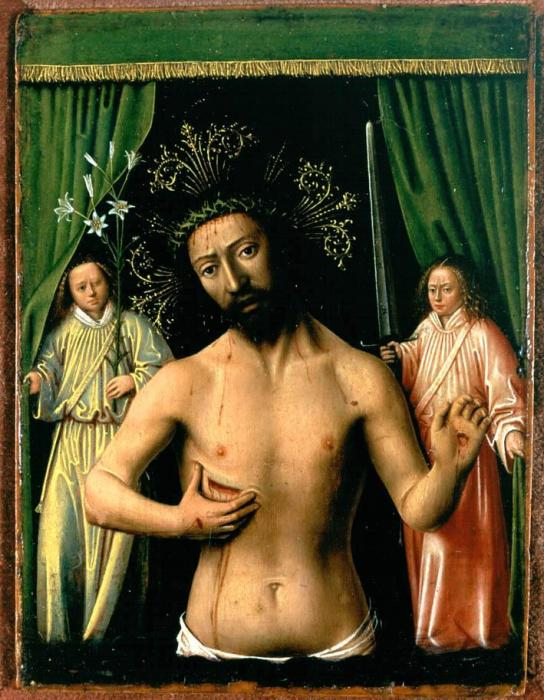
- Artist: Petrus Christus
- Year: c. 1450
- Type: panel painting
- Dimensions: 11.2 cm × 8.5 cm (4.4 in × 3.3 in)
- Location: Birmingham Museum and Art Gallery, England

Man of Sorrows (or Christ as the Man of Sorrows) is a very small panel painting by the Early Netherlandish artist Petrus Christus. It shows Christ as the Man of Sorrows, as if between death and resurrection, He is naked above the waist and bears the wounds of his Passion on his chest and hands. He is presented before a dark green curtain, held open by two large attendant angels who hold the emblems of a sword and bunch of lillies respectively, and whose dress and poise makes them appear almost regal.

The painting's small size and intimate setting indicate that it was commissioned for private devotional use and contemplation. It is usually dated to c. 1450 although some art historians believe it could be as early as 1444.

It has been in the collection of the Birmingham Museum and Art Gallery, England, since 1935.

== Description ==
=== Christ ===
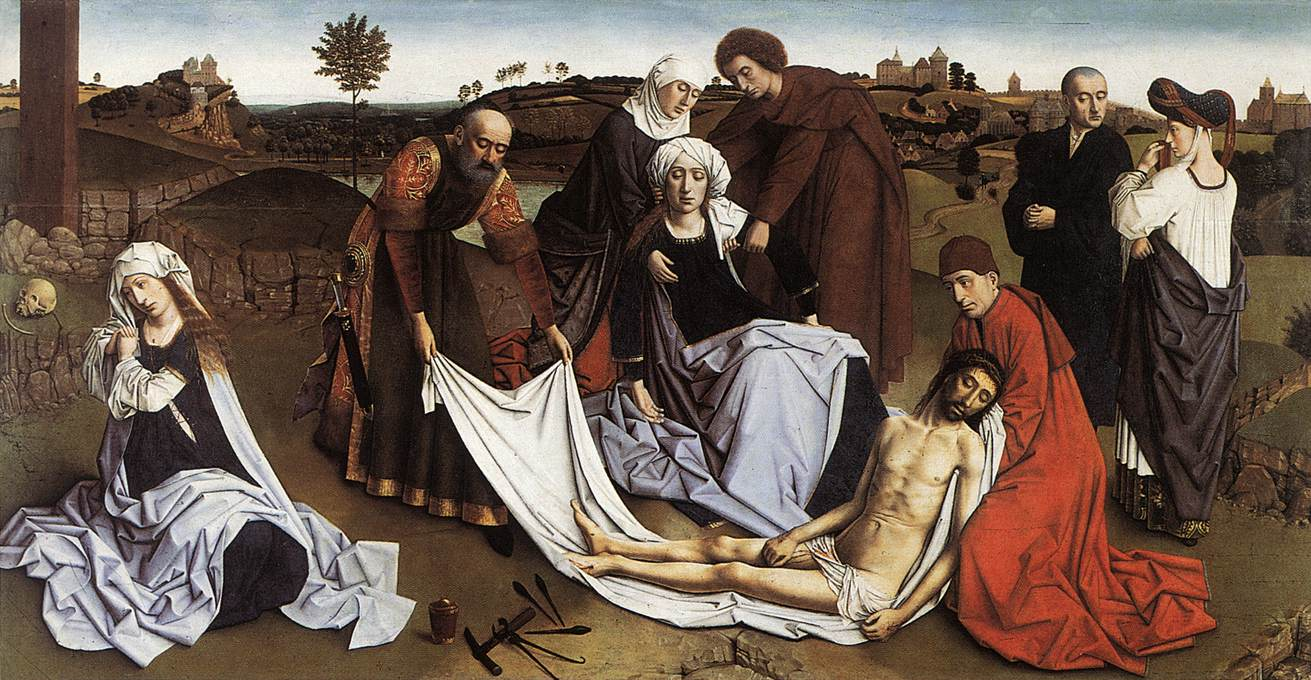
Lamentation, c. 1455–60. Royal Museums of Fine Arts of Belgium, Brussels

As is typical for paintings in the medieval Man of Sorrows tradition, Christ is shown as between death and resurrection, and is pale and emaciated. The colour of his flesh was achieved by layering unusually thin brush strokes over a flat and pinkish underpainting.

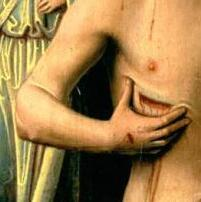
Detail of the wounds on Christ's body

He is streaming blood and looks outward at the viewer while, according to Rowlands, "dramatically confronting the beholder with the marks of His Passion by placing his right hand upon the wound in His side and by holding up His left hand to show the mark of the nail." Joel Upton described the figure as a standing "before the spectator as an immediate vision of the tortured Christ". Christ raises his right arm as if blessing, while blood eminnating from the crown of thorns pours across his face and over his shoulders.

Unlike Christus' portrait-like and realistic. 1444 Ecce Homo (also known as the Head of Christ), his face is highly idealised.c A number of art historians, including John Rowlands and John Oliver Hand, have noted the man of sorrow's similarity to the dead Christ in his c. 1455–60 Lamentation in Brussels.

The panel's painterly technique, colourisation and tone is often compared to his Madonna of the Dry Tree.

Christ wears a florated halo.

=== Angels ===
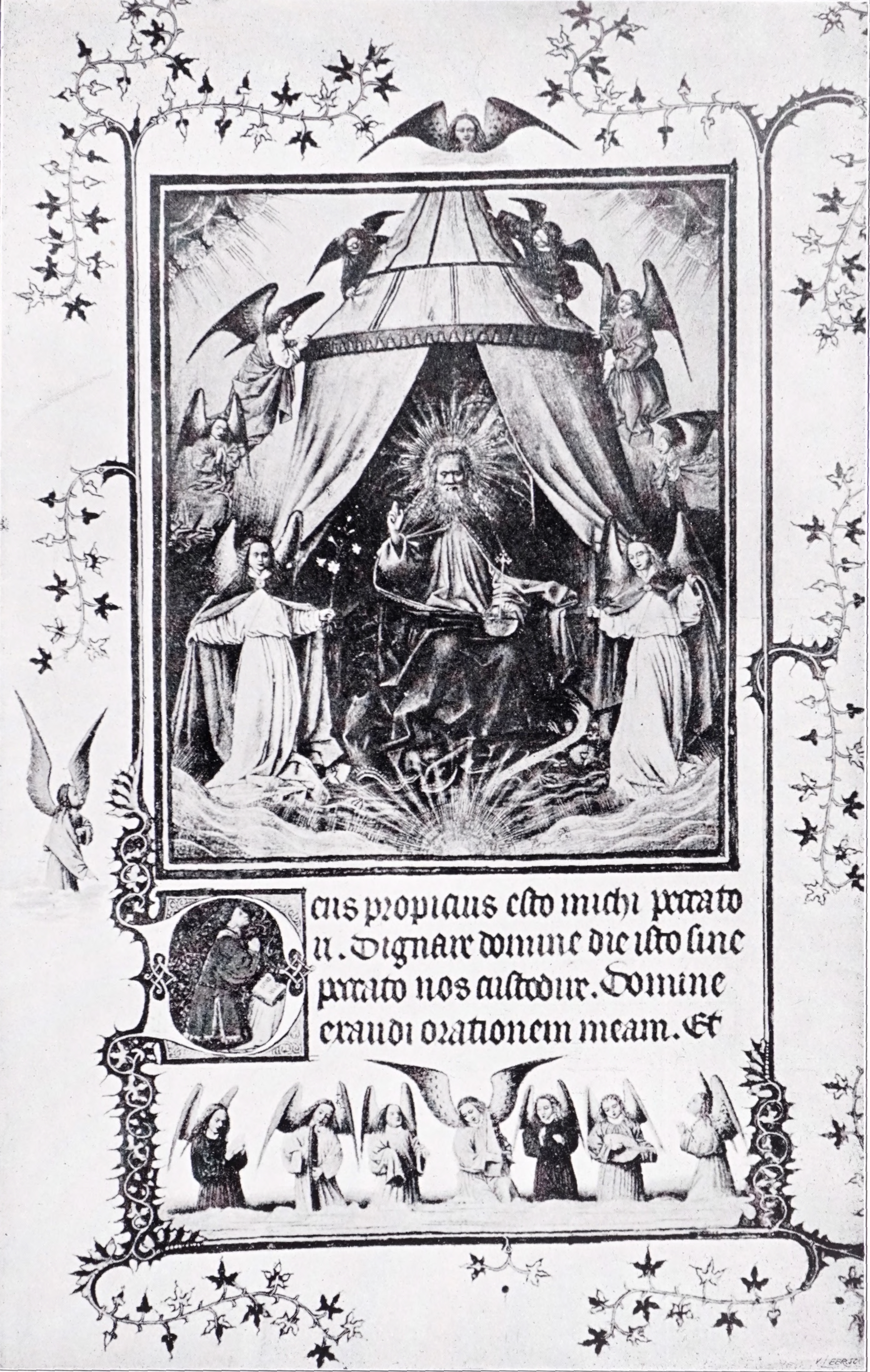
Folio from the Turin–Milan Hours, with angels holding a sword and lillies.

Behind him are two unusually large and human-like, hovering angels, seemingly in mourning. Both hold the ends of the dark green curtain. They bear the sword of judgement and lillies of mercy, symbols of justice and compassion, and thus likely represent the Last Judgment.

A similar combination of a sword and lilies featured in a now lost miniature of God the Father from the Turin–Milan Hours (c. 1420), but which was destroyed in a fire in 1904. The miniature showed God enthroned in a ceremonial pavilion or tent, positioned before heavy curtains that are also held open by two flanking angels holding the same emblems. Modern art historians attribute the miniature to the anonymous "Hand H", long suspected to be Christus himself.Even if Christus was not Hand H, the similarity is so striking that it was at least a direct source for the later painting.

According to the art historian Maryan Ainsworth, the way the angels draw back the curtains suggests that they are about to reveal an object of religious significance, perhaps a "relic or the Eucharist".

The reverse of the panel contains the seal of the Empress Maria Theresa (d. 1780).

== Gallery ==
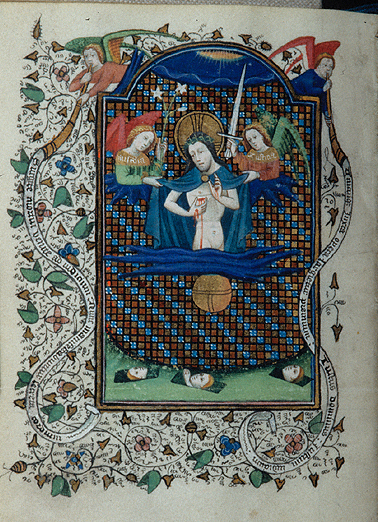
Man of Sorrows from a c. 1420 Book of hours. Morgan Library, NYC. Note the similar emblems.

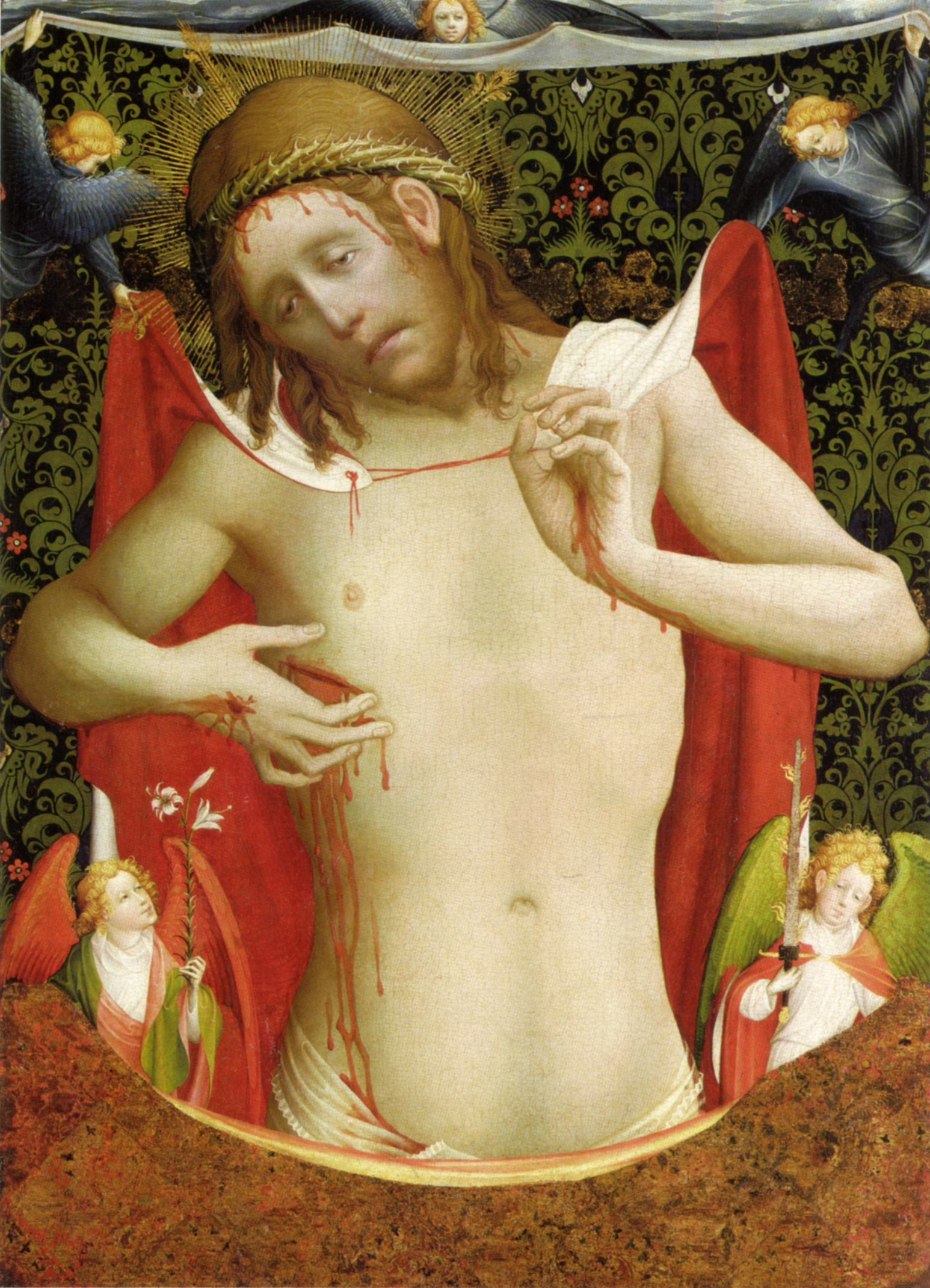
Man of sorrows with angels, Meister Francke, c. 1430. Note the angels holding back his cloak.

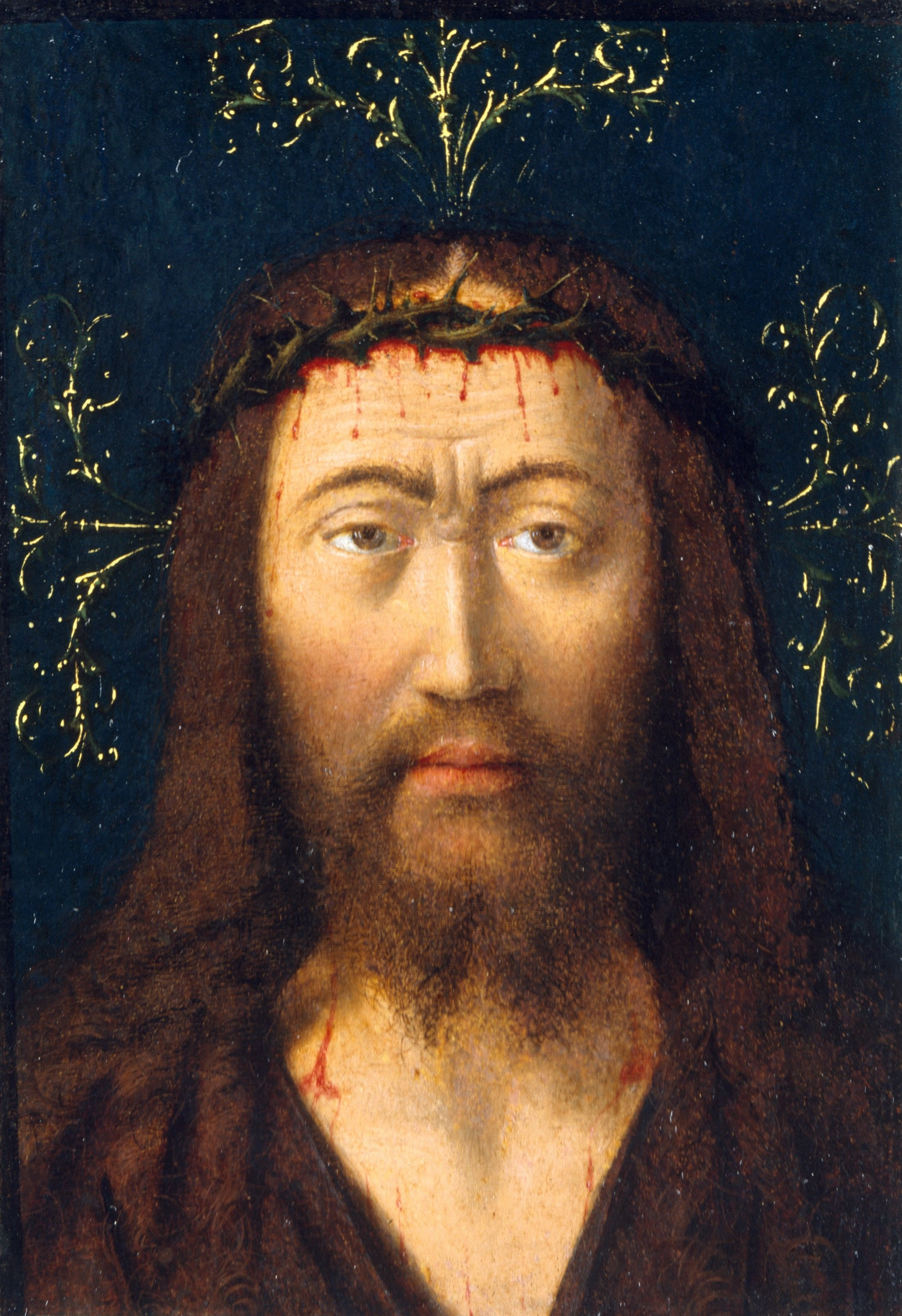
Ecce Homo, Christus, c. 1445, Metropolitan Museum of Art

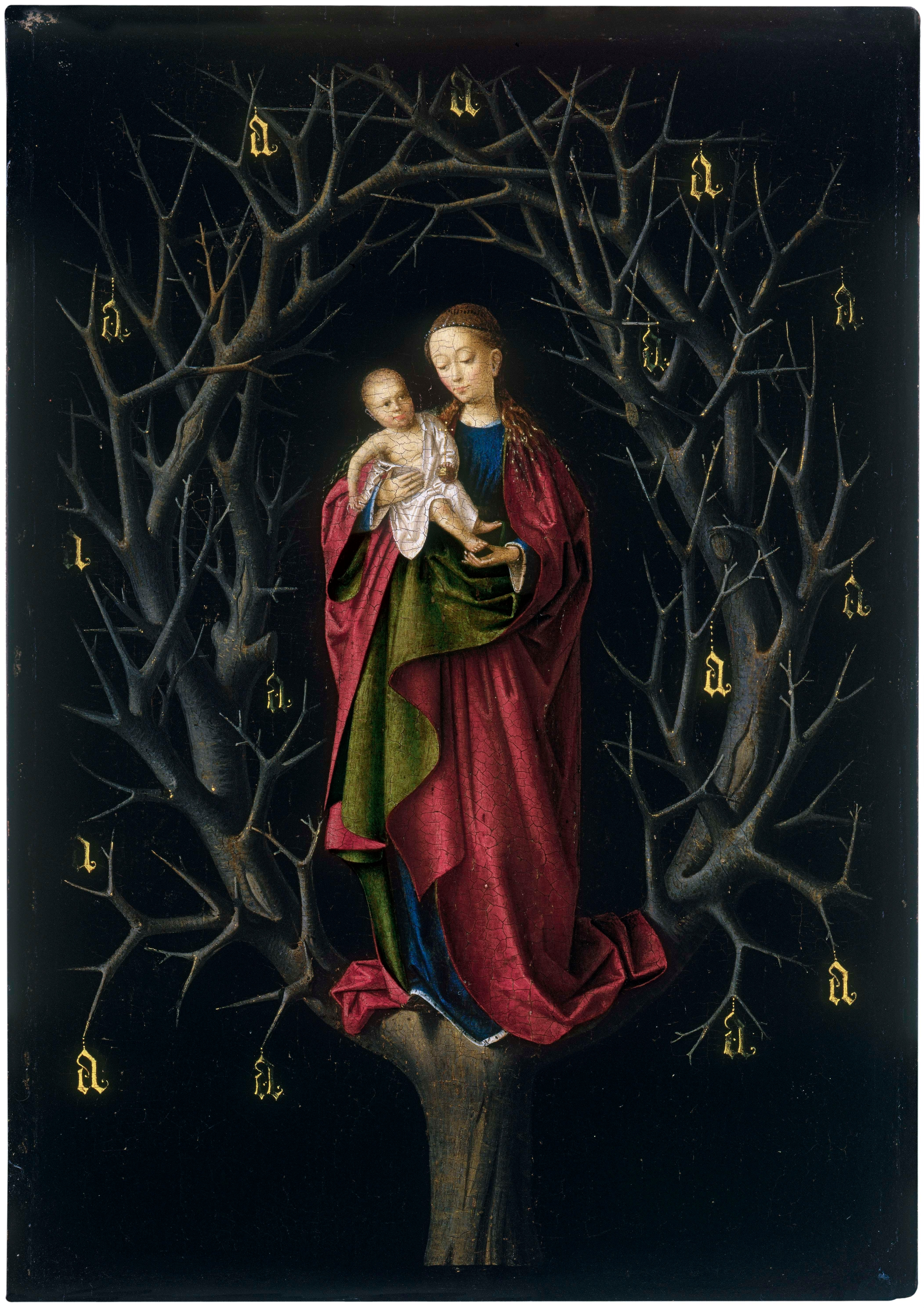
Madonna of the Dry Tree, Christus, c. 1462–1465

== Sources ==
- Ainsworth, Maryan. Petrus Christus: Renaissance Master of Bruges. New York: Metropolitan Museum of Art, 1994. ISBN 0-8109-6482-1
- Hand, John Oliver. "Salve sancta facies: some thoughts on the iconography of the Head of Christ by Petrus Christus." Metropolitan Museum Journal, volume 2, 1992.
- Panofsky, Erwin. Early Netherlandish Painting. Cambridge (MA): Harvard University Press, 1953
- Rowlands, John. "A Man of Sorrows by Petrus Christus". The Burlington Magazine, volume 104, number 715, October 1962. JSTOR 873762
- Upton, Joel Morgan. Petrus Christus: His Place in Fifteenth-Century Flemish painting. University Park, PA: Pennsylvania State University Press, 1989. ISBN 0-2710-0672-2
