= Triptych of the Madonna =

Altarpiece by Giovanni Bellini and others

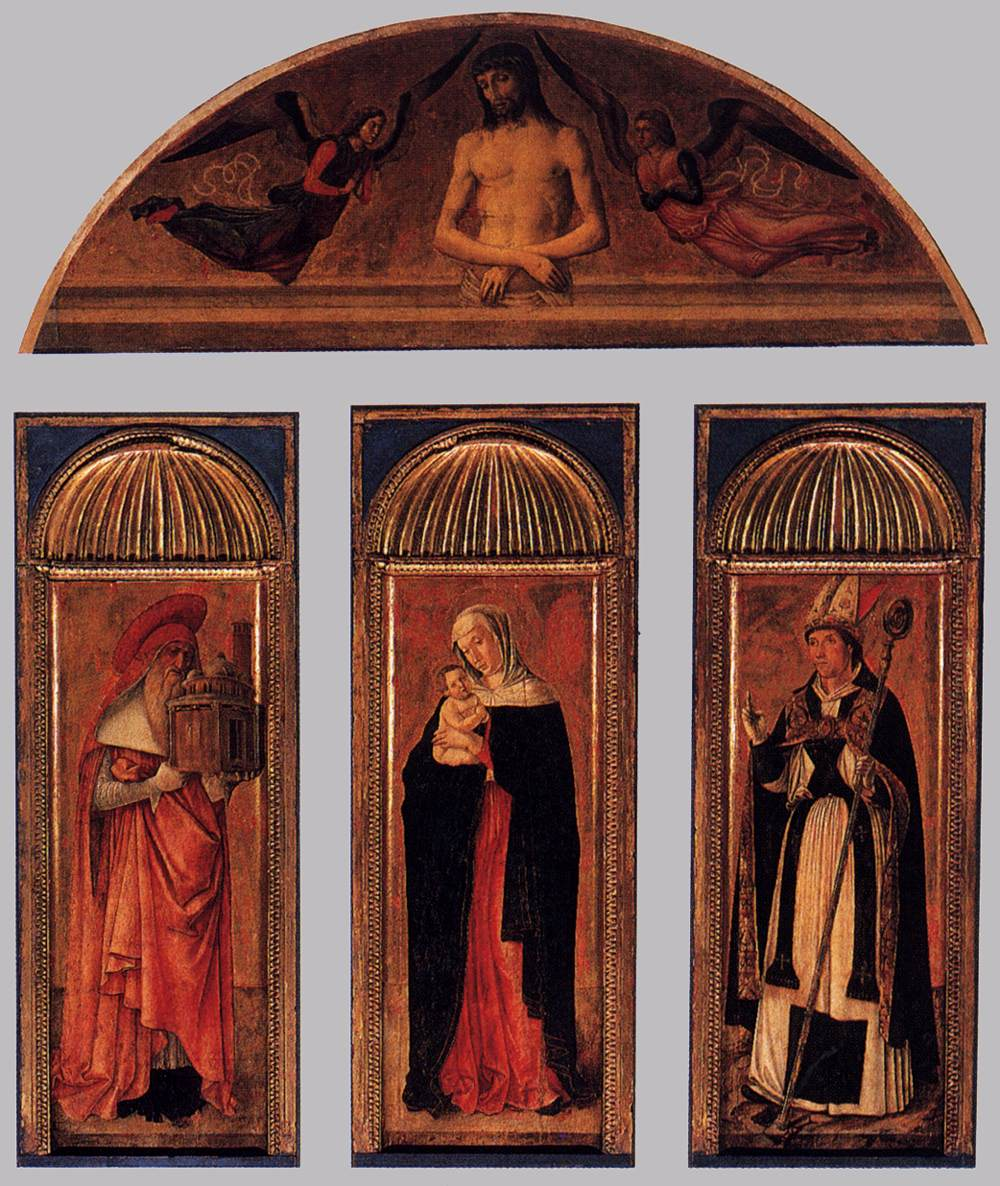
- Artist: Giovanni Bellini and others
- Year: 1464–1470
- Medium: tempera on panel
- Location: Gallerie dell'Accademia, Venice

The Triptych of the Madonna is a 1464–1470 tempera-on-panel altarpiece by the Italian Renaissance artist Giovanni Bellini and others. Its central panel of a standing Madonna and Child measures 127 by 48 cm, its lunette of the Man of Sorrows flanked by angels 59 by 170 cm and its side panels of Jerome and Louis of Toulouse 103 by 45 cm. It is now in the Gallerie dell'Accademia in Venice.

It is one of four triptychs produced between 1464 and 1470 for Santa Maria della Carità, Venice, which had been rebuilt in the 1450s and whose altars were built between 1460 and 1464. The other three are the San Lorenzo, Nativity and San Sebastiano Triptychs. They were probably all planned by Giovanni's father Jacopo.

By the time of the Fall of the Republic of Venice all four triptychs had been attributed to Vivarini. During the French occupation they were broken up and re-mounted before being assigned to the Gallerie dell'Accademia, which took over the church of Santa Maria della Carità

== See also ==
- List of works by Giovanni Bellini
