= San Lorenzo Triptych =

Altarpiece by Giovanni Bellini and others

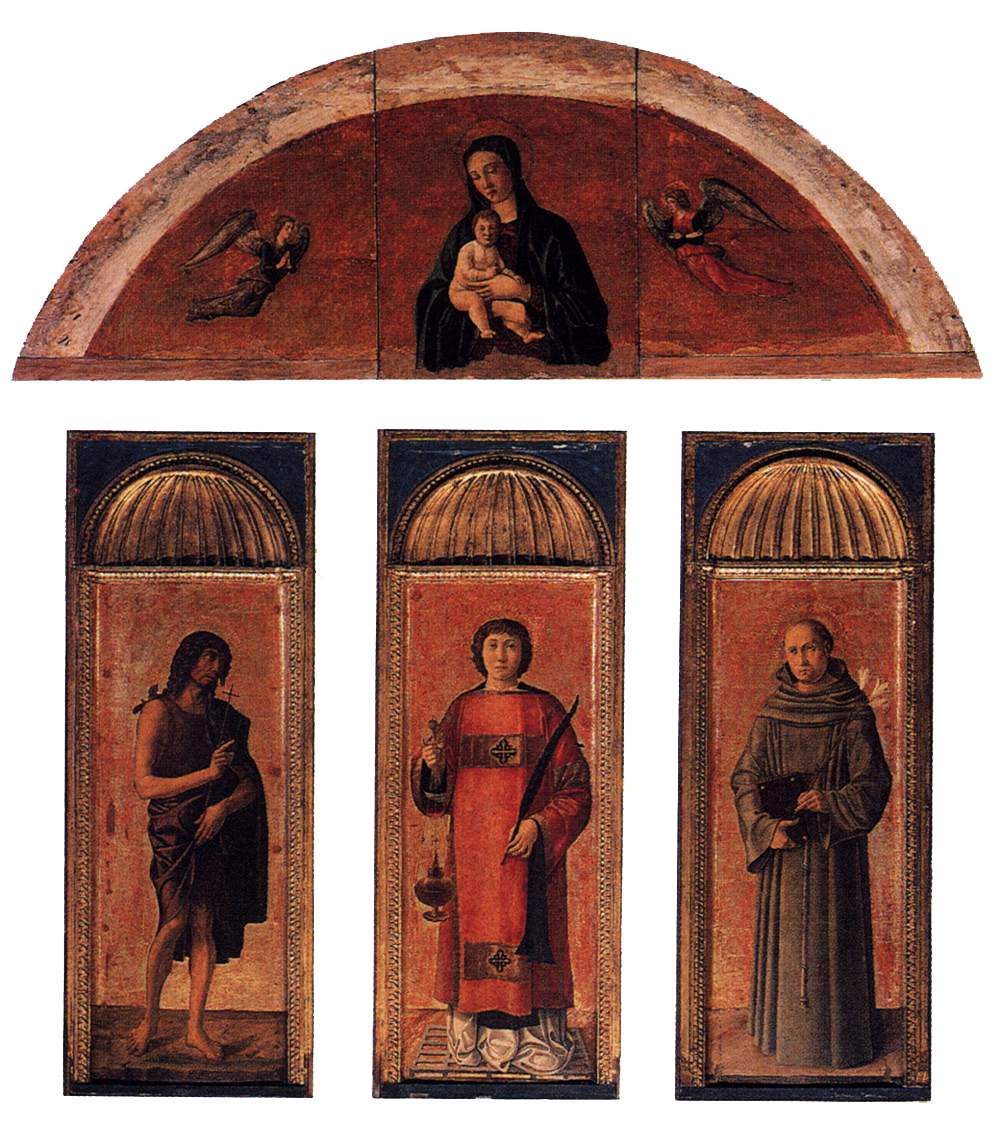
- Artist: Giovanni Bellini and others
- Year: 1464–1470
- Medium: tempera on panel
- Location: Gallerie dell'Accademia, Venice

The San Lorenzo Triptych is a tempera-on-panel altarpiece by the Italian Renaissance artist Giovanni Bellini and others. Its central panel of Saint Lawrence measures 127 by 48 cm, its lunette of the Madonna and Child 59 by 170 cm and its side panels of John the Baptist and Antony of Padua 103 by 45 cm each. It is now in the Gallerie dell'Accademia in Venice.

It is one of four triptychs produced between 1464 and 1470 for Santa Maria della Carità, Venice, which had been rebuilt in the 1450s, and whose altars were built between 1460 and 1464. The other three are the San Sebastiano, Madonna and Nativity Triptychs. They were probably all planned by Giovanni's father Jacopo. By the time of the Fall of the Republic of Venice all four works had been attributed to Vivarini. During the French occupation they were broken up and re-mounted before being assigned to the Gallerie dell'Accademia, which took over the church of Santa Maria della Carità

== See also ==
- List of works by Giovanni Bellini
