= Nativity Triptych (Bellini) =

Triptych by Giovanni Bellini, Accademia

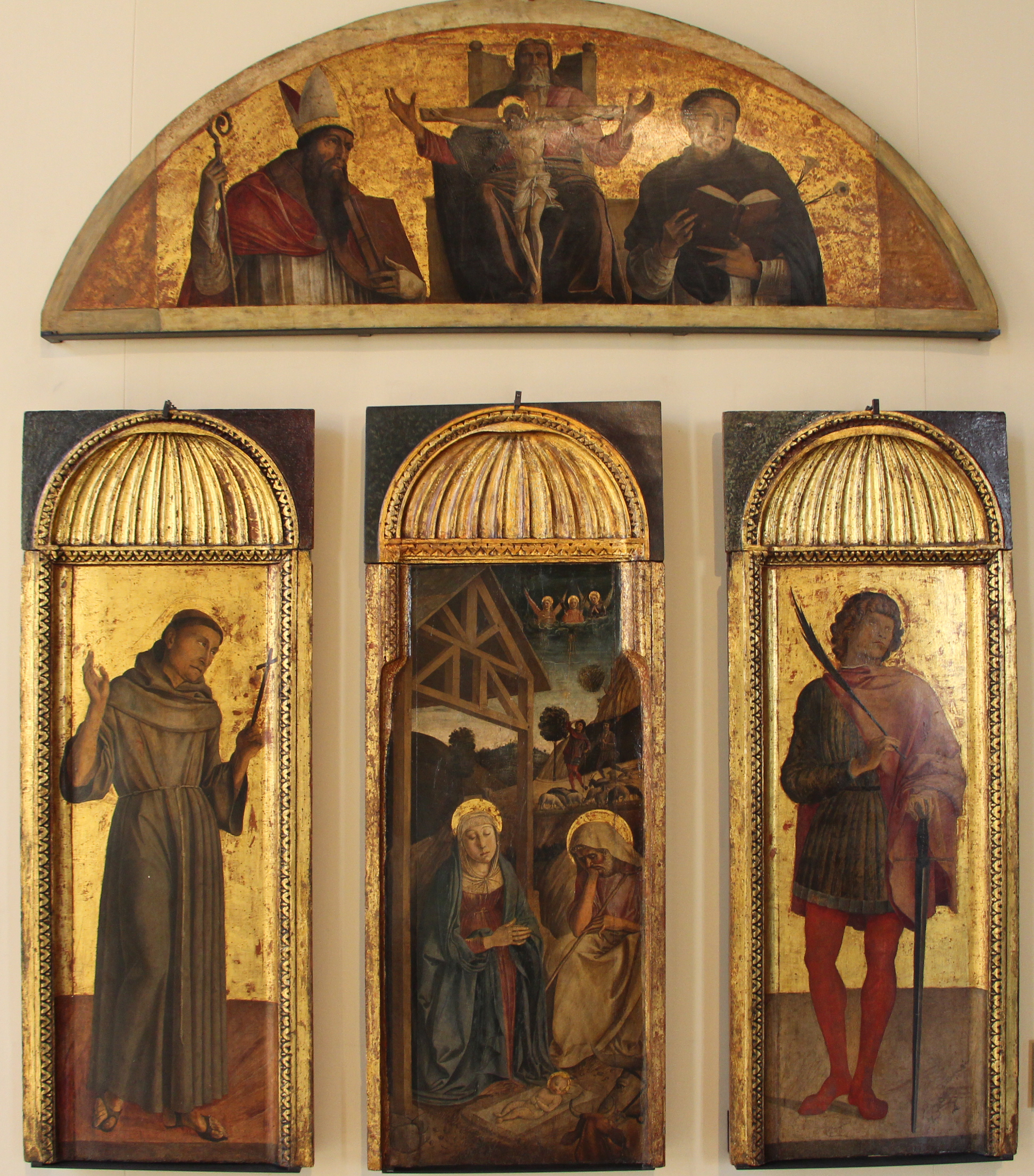
- Artist: Giovanni Bellini and others
- Year: 1464–1470
- Medium: tempera on panel
- Location: Gallerie dell'Accademia, Venice

The Nativity Triptych is a 1464–1470 tempera-on-panel altarpiece by the Italian Renaissance painter Giovanni Bellini and others, now in the Gallerie dell'Accademia in Venice. Its central panel of the Nativity measures 127 by 48 cm, its lunette of the Holy Trinity flanked by Augustine and Dominic 59 by 170 cm and its side panels of Francis of Assisi and Victor 103 by 45 cm.

It is one of four triptychs produced between 1464 and 1470 for Santa Maria della Carità, Venice, which had been rebuilt in the 1450s and whose altars were built between 1460 and 1464. The other three are the San Lorenzo, Madonna and San Sebastiano Triptychs. They were probably all planned by Giovanni's father Jacopo. The lunette was influenced by Donatello and Andrea Mantegna, whilst the central panel is not thought to be by Giovanni and is similar to a work by Vivarini in the Narodni Gallery in Prague.

By the time of the Fall of the Republic of Venice all four triptychs had been attributed to Vivarini – during the French occupation they were broken up and re-mounted before being assigned to the Gallerie dell'Accademia, which took over the church of Santa Maria della Carità The painting has undergone recent cleaning and conservation, supported by the Venice in Peril Fund.

In early 2019 the charity "Venice in Peril" began a campaign to raise £55,000 to fund a conservation project to learn "more about Giovanni Bellini's early working life" and that of his family and other artists from his workshop.

== See also ==
- List of works by Giovanni Bellini
