= Fortifications of Kotor =

UNESCO World Heritage Site in Montenegro

- Kotor in Montenegro
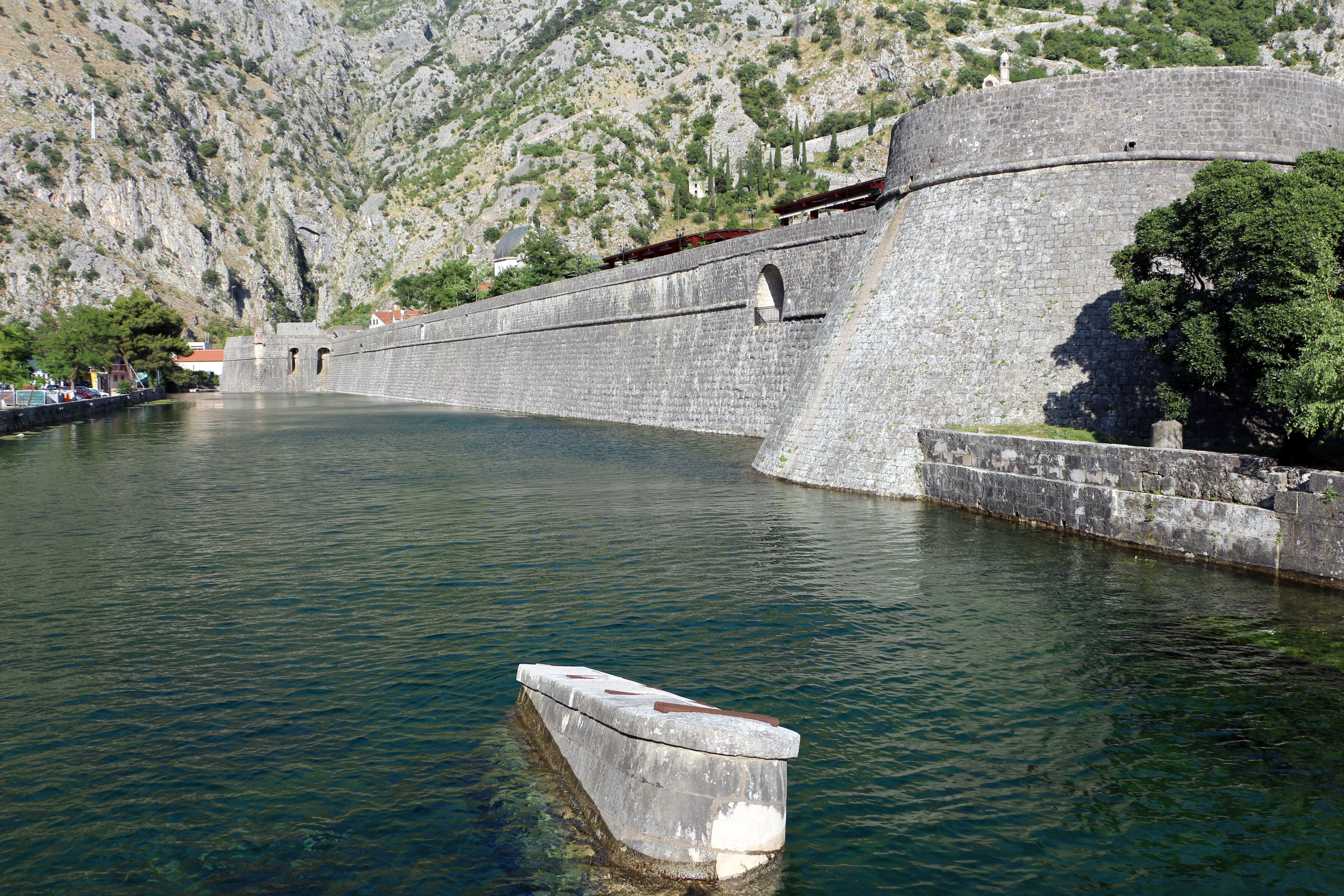

Location
- Location in Montenegro
- Coordinates: 42°25′25″N 18°46′19″E

UNESCO World Heritage Site
- Part of: Natural and Culturo-Historical Region of Kotor
- Criteria: Cultural: (i)(ii)(iii)(iv)
- Reference: 125ter
- Inscription: 1979 (3rd Session)
- Extensions: 2012, 2015
- Endangered: 1979–2003

UNESCO World Heritage Site
- Official name: Fortified city of Kotor
- Part of: Venetian Works of Defence between the 16th and 17th Centuries: Stato da Terra – Western Stato da Mar
- Criteria: Cultural: (iii)(iv)
- Reference: 1533-006
- Inscription: 2017 (41st Session)
- Area: 16.32 ha (40.3 acres)
- Buffer zone: 99.19 ha (245.1 acres)

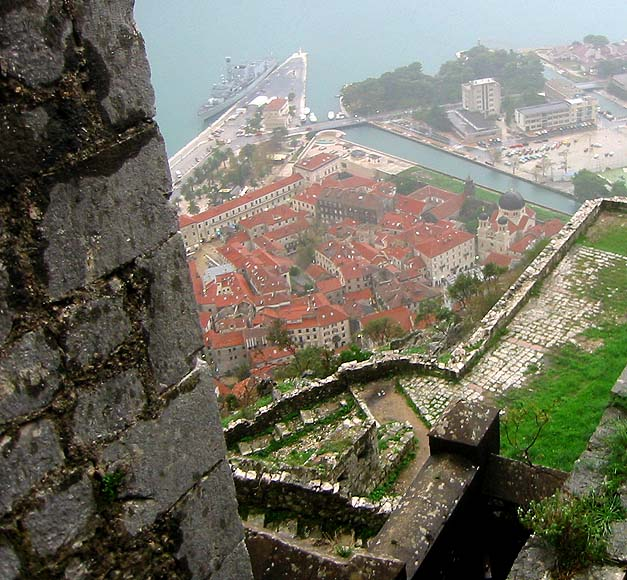
View of old Kotor from the ramparts.

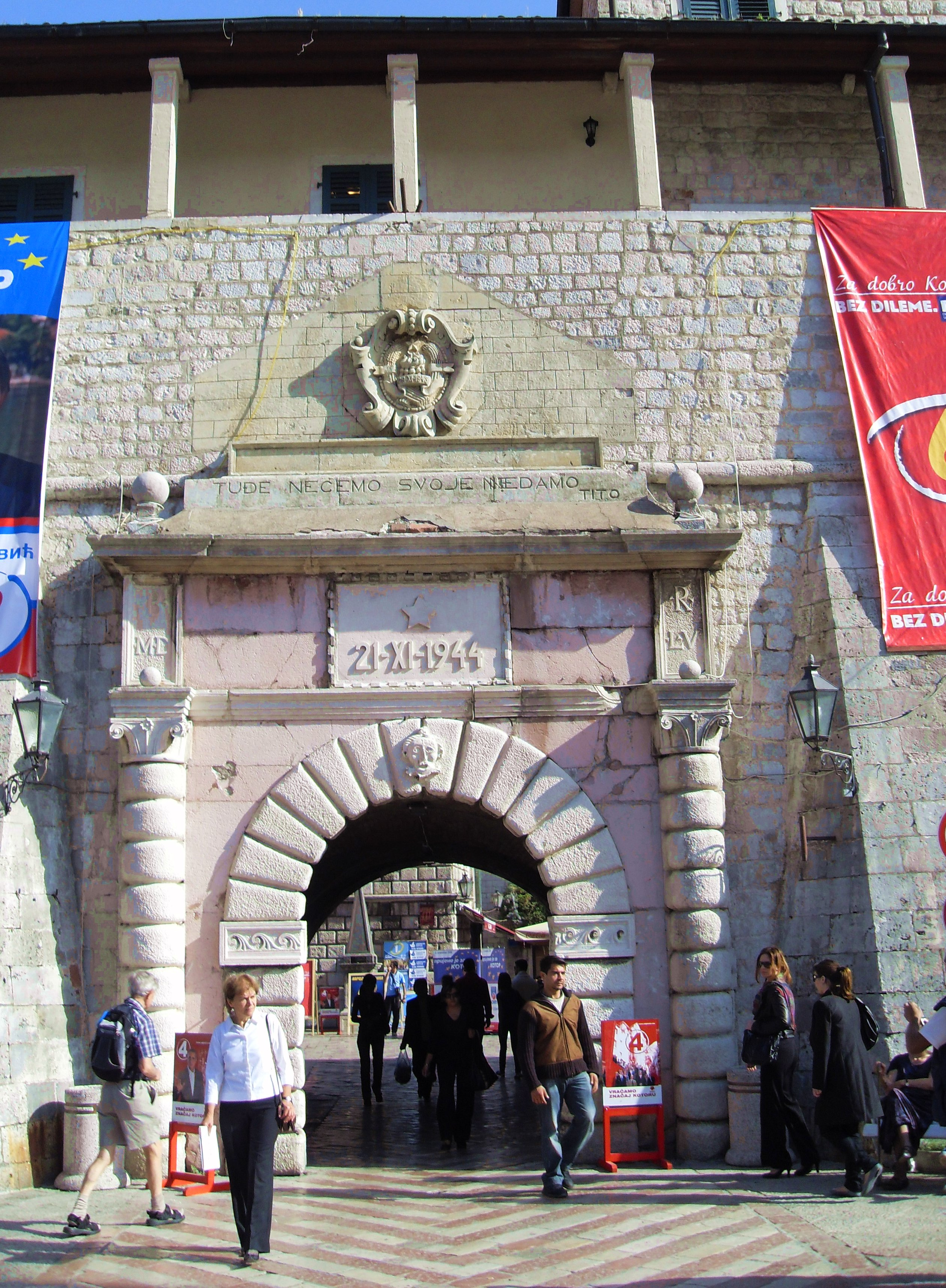
The Sea Gate, main entrance to the old city.

The fortifications of Kotor (Italian: Cattaro) are an integrated historical fortification system that protected the medieval town of Kotor containing ramparts, towers, citadels, gates, bastions, forts, cisterns, a castle, and ancillary buildings and structures. They incorporate military architecture of Illyria, the Byzantine Empire, Venice, and Austria. Together with the old town and its natural surroundings the fortifications were inscribed in the list of World Heritage Sites in 1979 labelled Natural and Culturo-Historical Region of Kotor and represent the only such site of cultural significance in Montenegro.

The fortified city of Kotor was also included in UNESCO's World Heritage Site list as part of Venetian Works of Defence between 15th and 17th centuries: Stato da Terra – western Stato da Mar in 2017.

== History ==
The top of the mountain of St. John was already fortified during Illyrian times. In the 6th century the Byzantine emperor Justinian I reconstructed the fortress. With the retreat of the Byzantines, eventually and in spite of numerous incursions some independence was attained, however this had no lasting effects upon the fortifications. This changed when in 1420 the then independent Republic of Cattaro succumbed to Venetian rule. As part of Albania Veneta the fortifications received their current structure. During this time there were two Ottoman sieges, in 1538–1571 and 1657–1699. In 1797 the fortifications passed to the Habsburg monarchy with the Treaty of Campo Formio. In 1805, Kotor was assigned to the French Empire's client state, the Napoleonic Kingdom of Italy by the Treaty of Pressburg, but occupied by Russian troops under Dmitry Senyavin until they left after the Treaty of Tilsit in 1807. Three years later it was incorporated into the French Empire's Illyrian Provinces. The fortifications (then named Cattaro) were attacked by the British naval Captain William Hoste with his ship HMS Bacchante (38 guns). In an "unmilitary manner" he hauled his ships' cannon to positions above the fort using block and tackle and started the shelling. After a ten-day siege, the French garrison had no alternative and surrendered on January 5, 1814. With the Congress of Vienna Kotor was returned to the Austrian Empire. After their defeat in World War I the Austrians left and the fortress was no longer manned. During World War II Kotor was occupied by the Axis forces and liberated on November 21, 1944, a date commemorated over the Sea Gate.

Severe earthquakes that damaged the fortifications occurred in 1563, 1667, and most recently, on 15 April 1979.

== Description ==
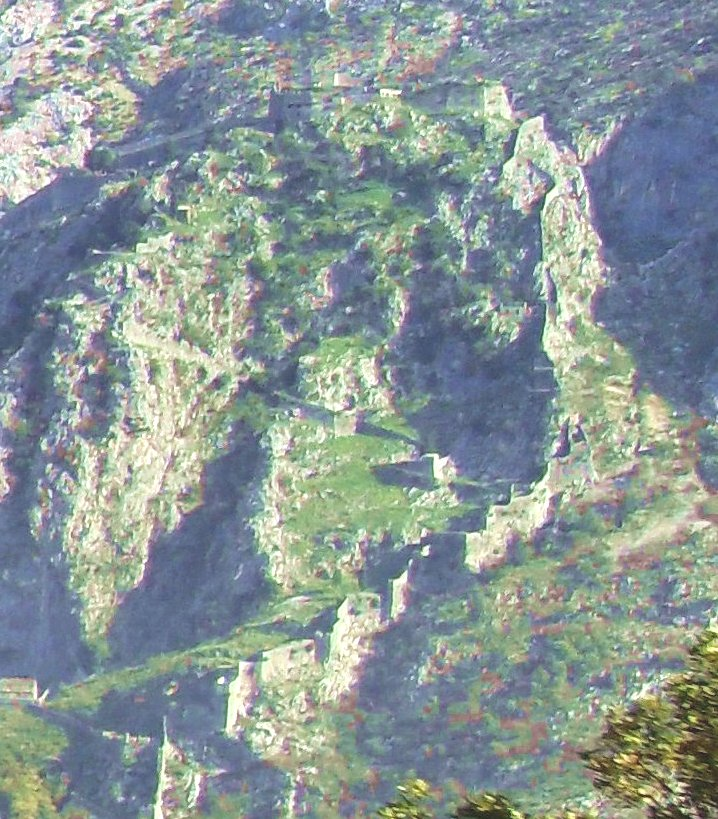
The castle St. John (San Giovanni) and the western hillside wall.

The medieval part of the town of Kotor is located on a triangular piece of land that is bordered by the most inner extension of the Bay of Kotor at its south-western side, the river Skurda toward the North, and the mountain of St. John (San Giovanni) towards the East. City walls protect the city on its northern and south-western side, towards the waters. The walls are fortified by bastions, most prominent being the Kampana tower and citadel (13th to 14th century) near the point where the river enters the bay. Close to it is the Sea Gate (also Main Gate) from 1555 allowing access from the bay, the two other gates to the city are the River Gate (also North Gate) from 1540 with the nearby Bembo Bastion from 1540 and the Gurdic Gate (also South Gate), the latter modified many times and fortified by the Gurdic Bastion from 1470. The Bembo Bastion has been converted into an open theatre. Two additional gates were present, one walled up south of the Sea Gate, the other, Spiljarskia Gate, within the ramparts of the hillside towards the old road to Cetinje. From the Bembo Bastion and the Gurdic Bastion ramparts climb up to the top of the St. John Mountain that backs the city. The ramparts have positions at various points; within them is a network of communications as well as additional buildings including the Church of Our Lady of Remedy from 1518. On top of the mountain is the San Giovanni castel at a 280-meter height dominating the eastern bay, the fortification system and the city. Behind the castle hill the inhabitable and mountainous countryside further ascends toward the Lovcen. The circumference of the outer wall is 4.5 km, with a thickness between 2 and 16 m, and a height up to 20 m.

== Preservation ==
The 1979 earthquake damaged much of the buildings in Kotor including the fortifications. The site was placed on the World Heritage List the same year, and also on the List in Danger. After rehabilitation it was taken off the latter in 2003, however, most of the rehabilitation took place in the old town. The fortifications are the most significant aspect of the World Heritage site and while they contain elements of different epochs, it was the Venetians who constructed most of the present structures. As such the monument represents one of the most important examples of defensive Venetian military architecture. The International Council on Monuments and Sites urged in 2001 the revitalization of the fortress. The European Commission took interest in the fortification not only for its cultural significance but also to maintain and develop it as a resource for tourism, a major part of the local economy. It found the fortifications in poor condition. They had been abandoned since the departure of the Austrians in 1918. Lack of maintenance, erosion, earthquakes, and vegetation have contributed to its ongoing deterioration. It was proposed to restore the ramparts of the hillside and the city, and to repair towers and sightseeing points, footpaths and accessory buildings to repair the fortification complex and harness its economic potential.

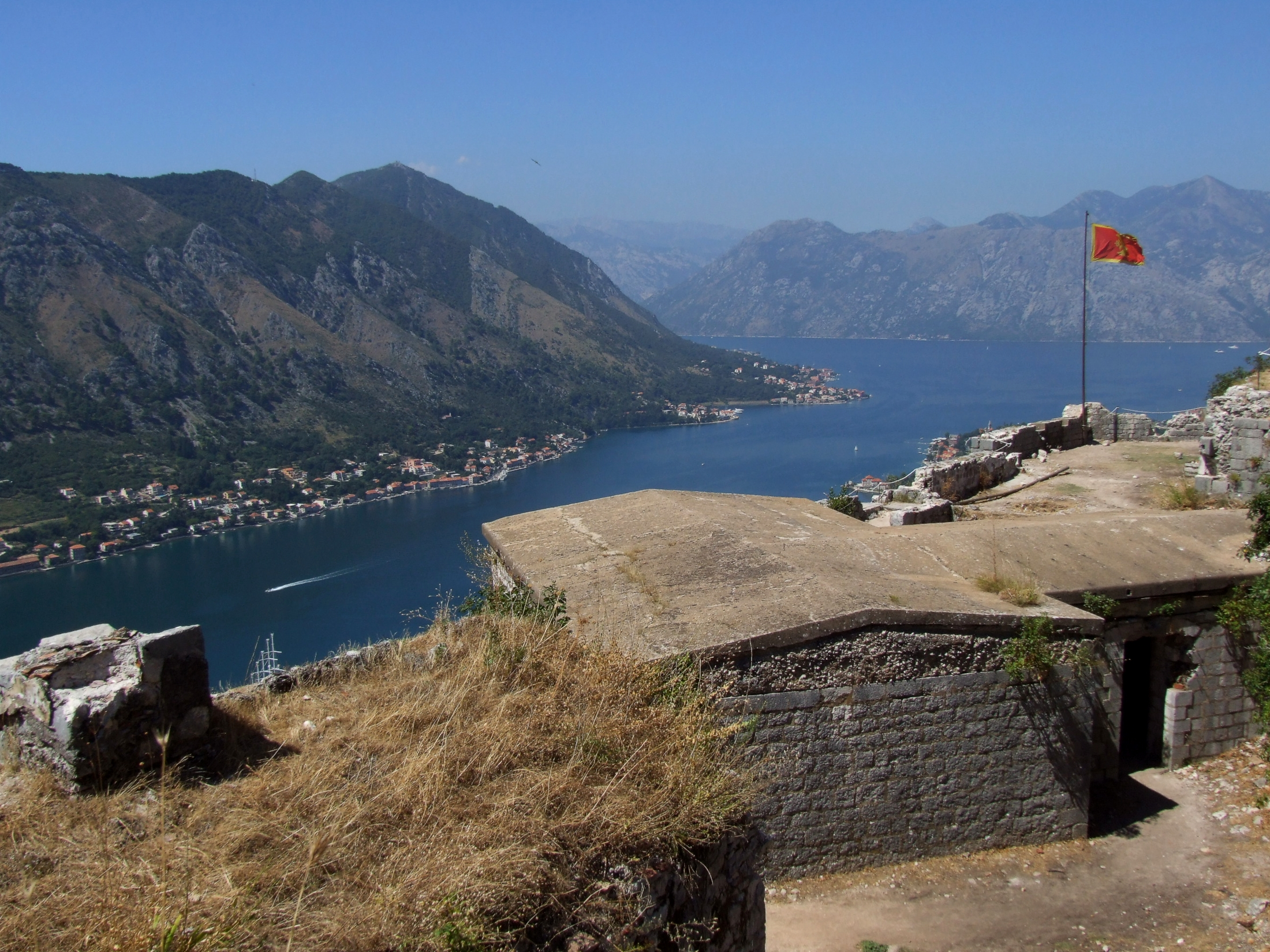
Bay of Kotor - view from St. John castle

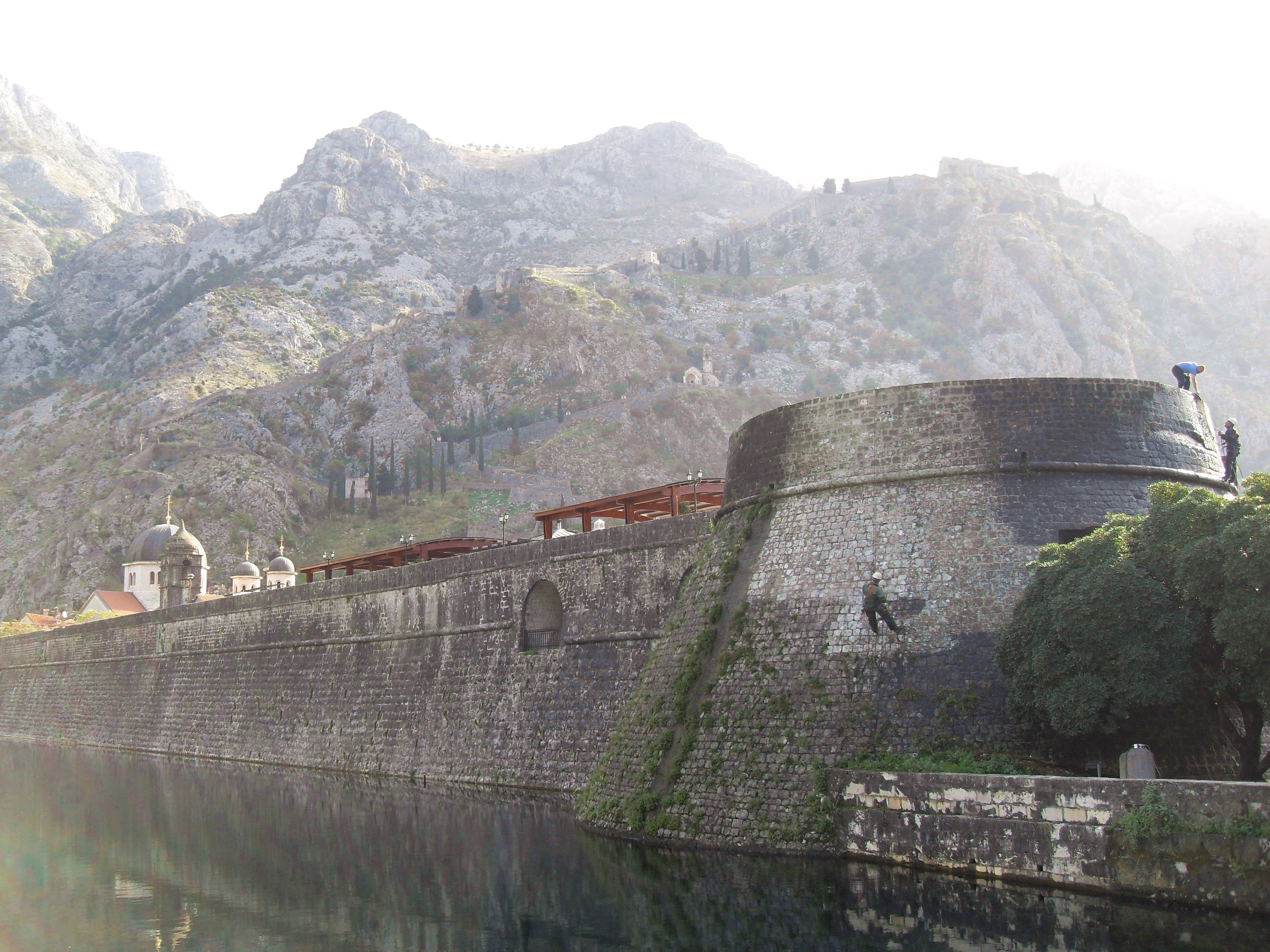
Kampana tower being restored.

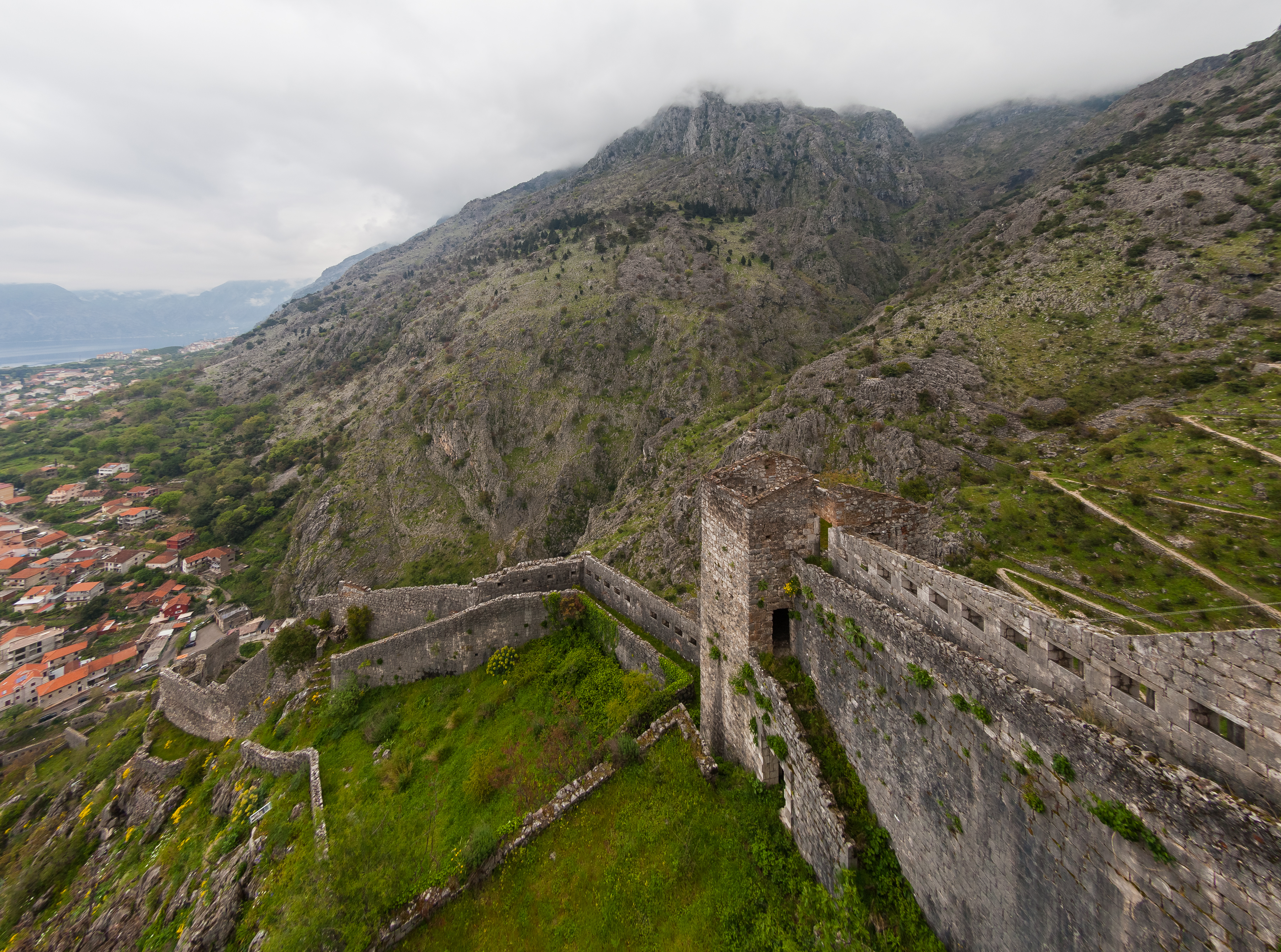

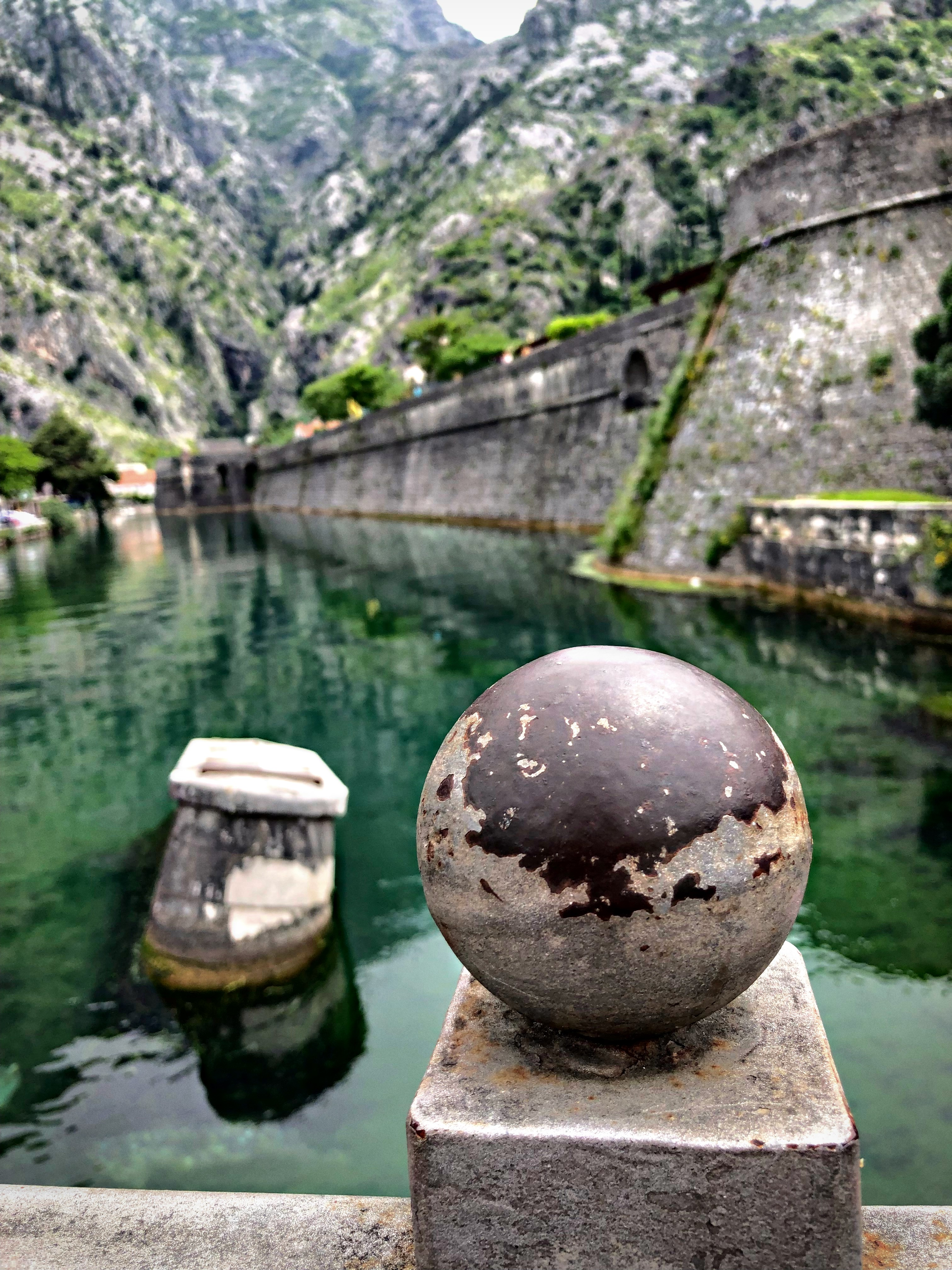

== See also ==
- Venetian Works of Defence between the 16th and 17th centuries: Stato da Terra – western Stato da Mar
