= Trg od Oružja =

Square in Kotor, Montenegro

Coordinates: 42.424898°N 18.76984°E

Trg od Oružja (Cyrillic: Трг од оружја; meaning "Arms Square") is the main and the largest town square in Kotor, Montenegro.

It hosts several stores, banks, cafés, bakeries and pastry shops, as well as many important cultural-historical monuments. Its name hails from Venetian times, when munitions were made and stored here.

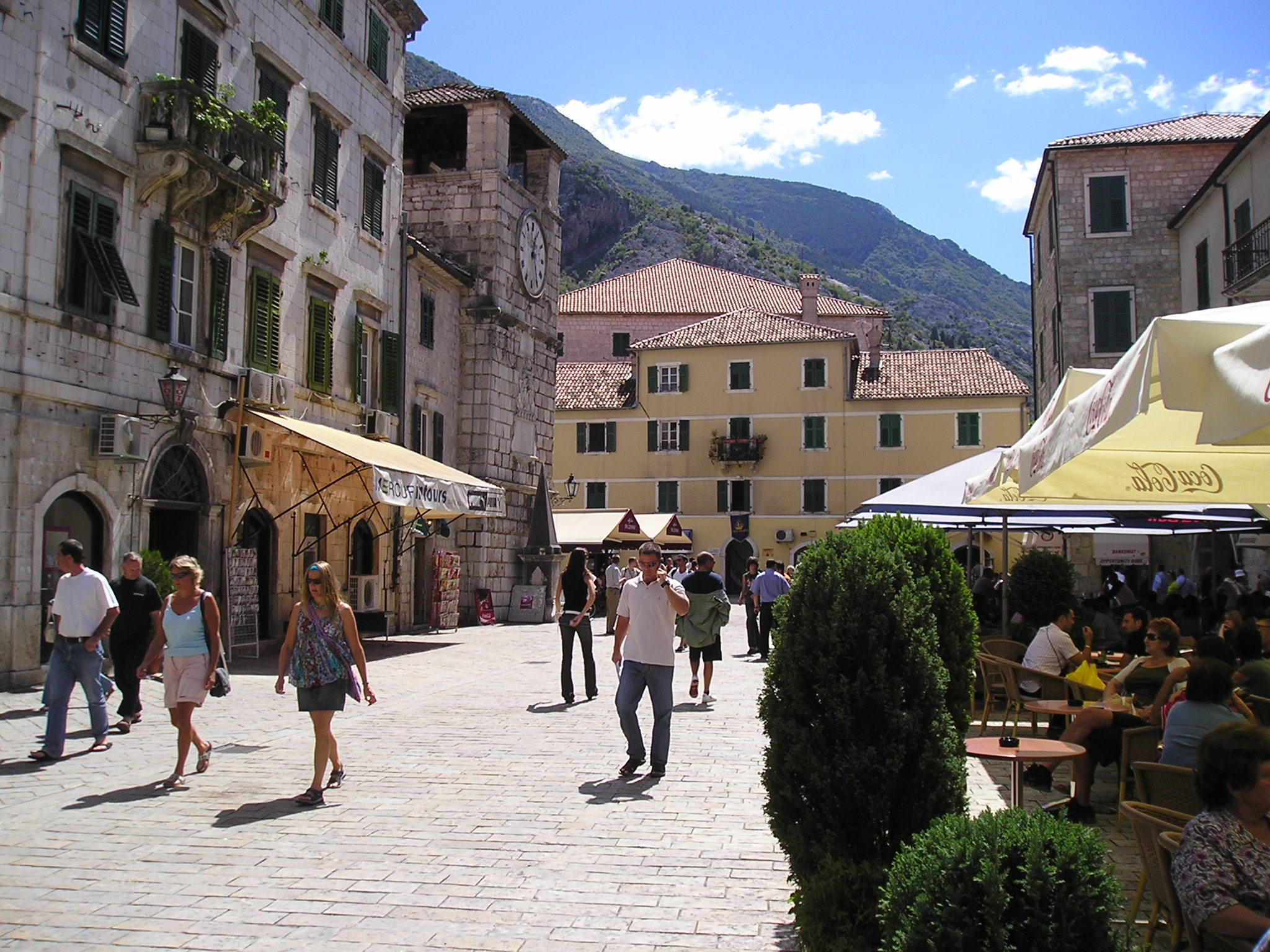
A view of the square

== Notable sights ==
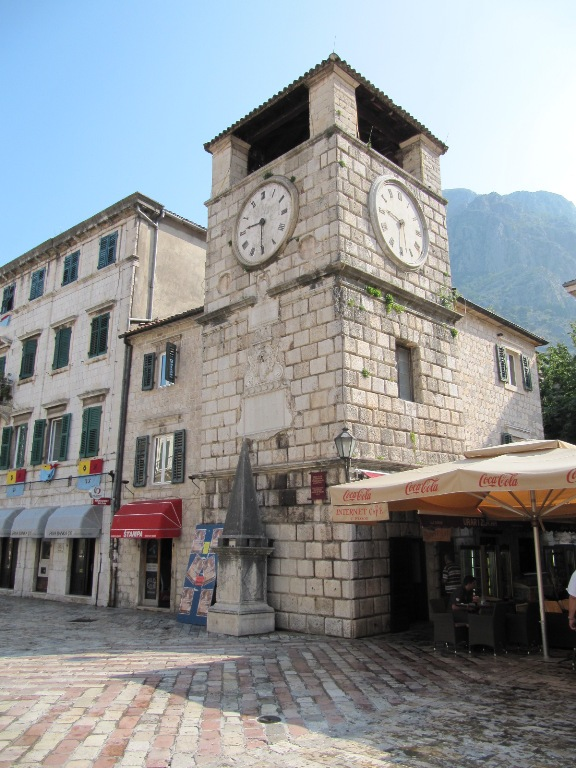
The Clock Tower

=== The Sea Gate ===
The Sea Gate (Montenegrin: Vrata od Mora, Врата од Мора) or the West Gate (Zapadna vrat', Западна врата) is the main entrance to the Old Town of Kotor. The Gate was built in the 16th century and is the biggest of the town's three gates.

=== Rector's Palace ===
The Rector's Palace (Montenegrin: Kneževa (Providurova) palata, Кнежева (Провидурова) палата) was built in the 17th century. It shores up the square's western side and is currently a part of the luxury Hotel Cattaro.

=== Napoleon's Theatre ===
The Napoleon's Theatre (Montenegrin: Napoleonovo pozorište, Наполеоново позориште) was one of the first theatres constructed in the Balkans and functioned as such until the late nineteenth century. The building itself was built in the 17th century and was turned into a theatre in 1810. During the 20th century, it functioned as the Town Hall, and today it accommodates Hotel Cattaro's reception.

=== Clock Tower ===
The Clock Tower was built in the 17th century. It was built partly in Baroque style, while the northern and eastern facades were built in Gothic style. A reconstructed medieval pillory stands in front of the tower.
