= Church of Our Lady of Remedy =

Roman Catholic church in Kotor, Montenegro

- Crkva Gospe od Zdravlja
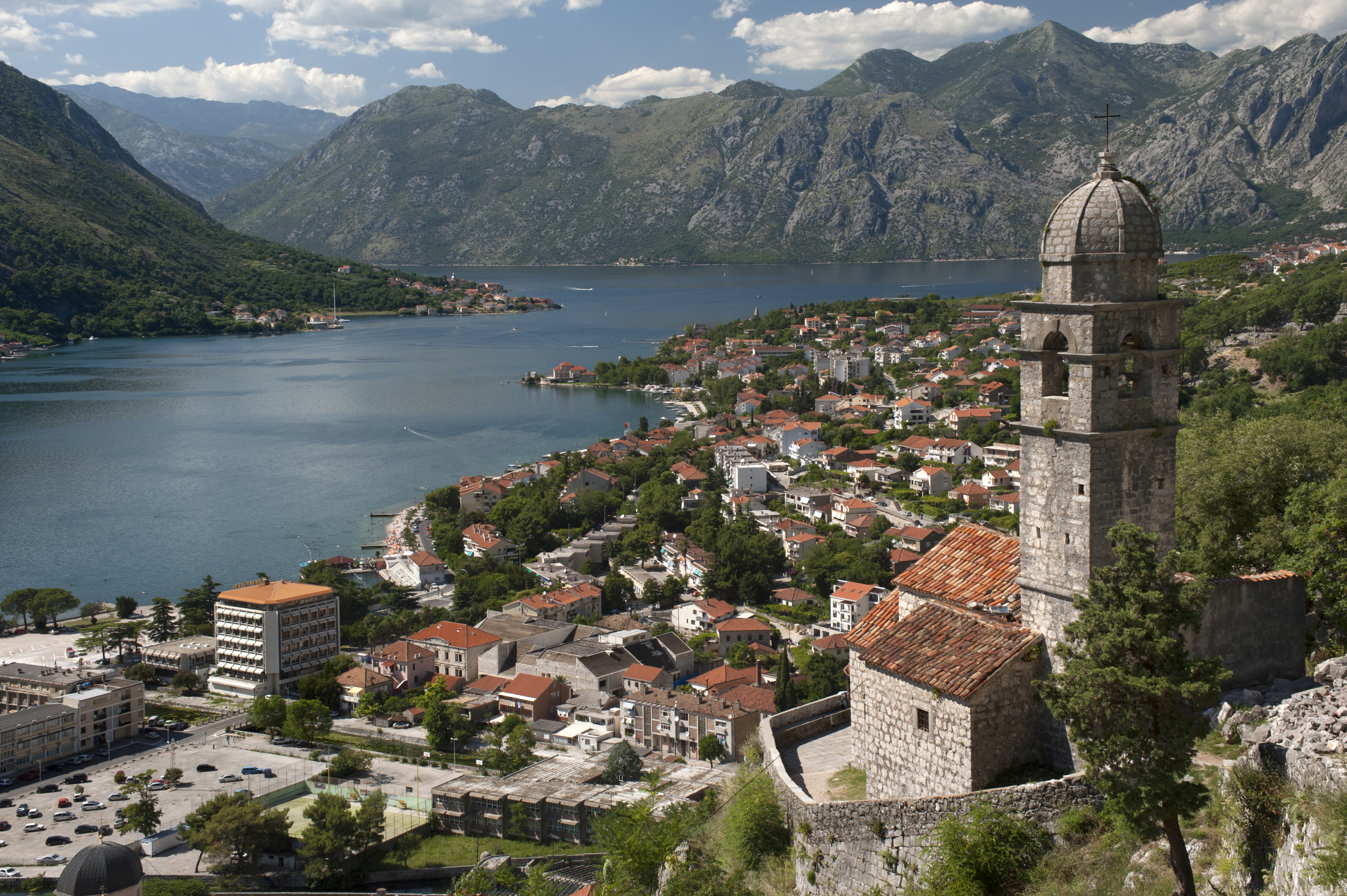
- Church of Our Lady of Remedy as seen from behind and the Kotor Riviera.
- Church of Our Lady of Remedy
- 42°25′48″N 18°46′12″E
- Denomination: Roman Catholic Church

History
- Founded: 1518
- Dedication: Our Lady of Remedy (Mary)

Administration
- Diocese: Roman Catholic Diocese of Kotor

The Church of Our Lady of Remedy (Serbian: Црква Госпе од Здравља, romanized: Crkva Gospe od Zdravlja) is a Roman Catholic church located in Kotor, Montenegro, belonging to the Roman Catholic Diocese of Kotor. The church is perched on the slope of St. John Mountain. It was completed in 1518.

Visitors can only reach the church on foot by climbing up stairs with over 650 steps.

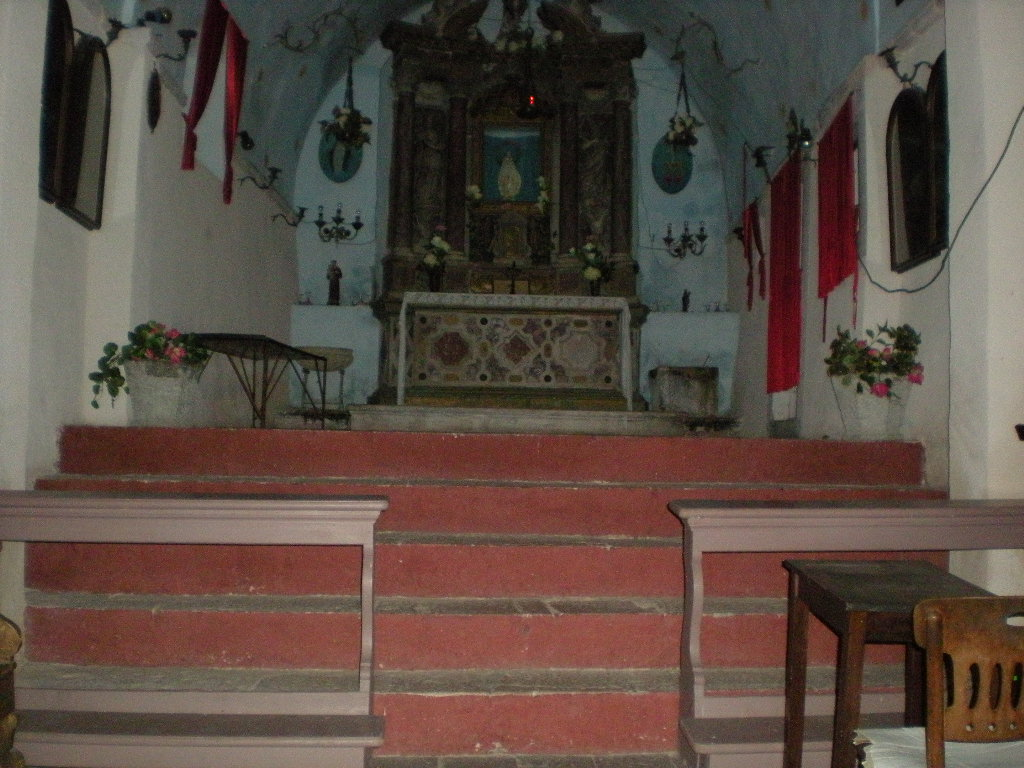
.

The oldest known building in Montenegro, dating back to the 6th century, has been found under the Church of Our Lady of Remedy. That building was an early Christian basilica, located close to the main city gate in the Old Town of Kotor.
