= Church of St. Nicholas, Kotor =

Serbian Orthodox church in Kotor, Montenegro

Church of St. Nicholas
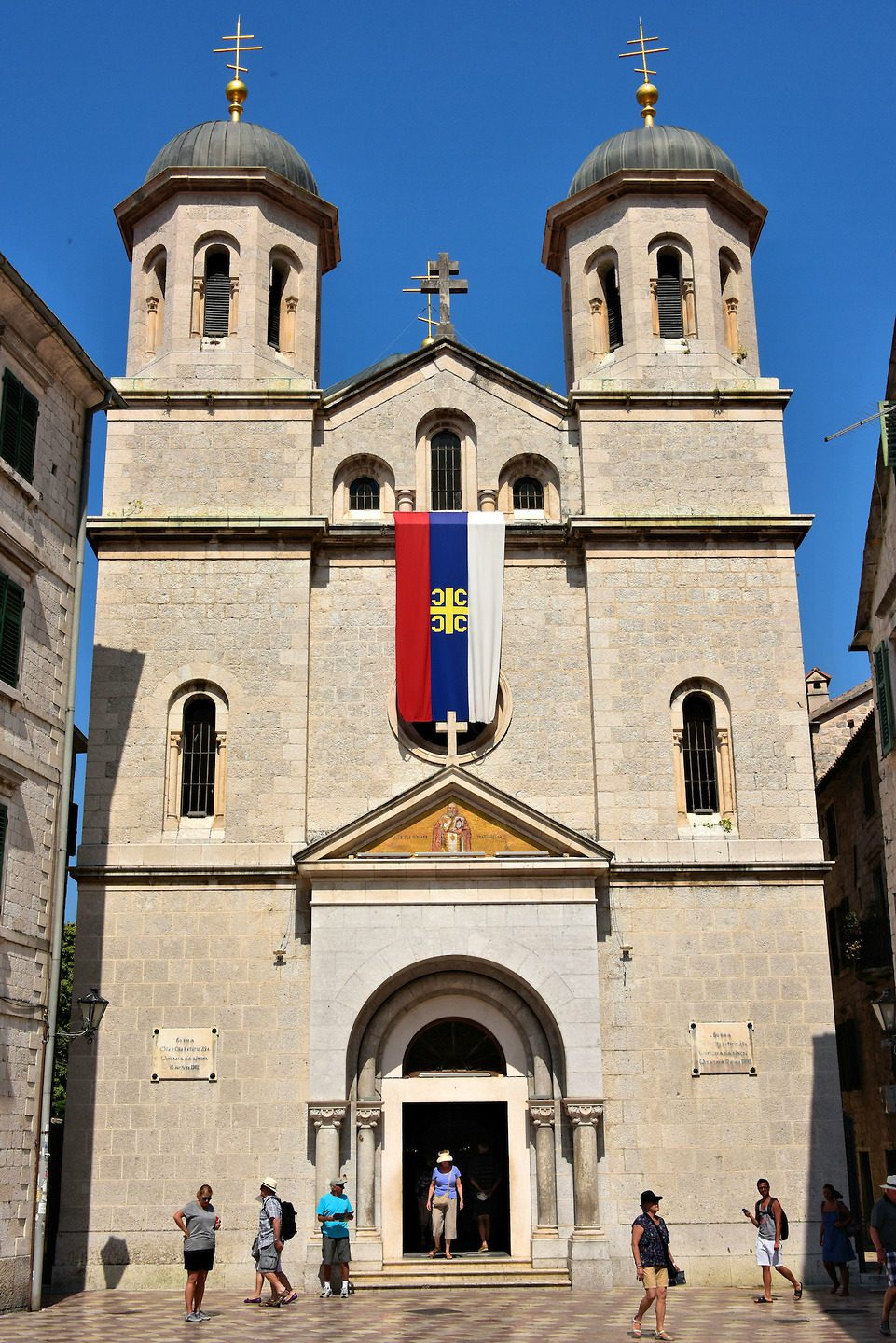

Religion
- Affiliation: Serbian Orthodox Church
- Ecclesiastical or organizational status: Metropolitanate of Montenegro and the Littoral

Location
- Municipality: Kotor
- State: Montenegro
- Interactive map of Church of St. Nicholas
- Coordinates: 42.4257°N 18.7708°E

Architecture
- Completed: 1902-1909

The Church of St. Nicholas (Serbian: Црква Светог Николе, romanized: Crkva Svetog Nikole) is a Serbian Orthodox church built from 1902 to 1909 in the city of Kotor. On that place the Orthodox Church existed from 1810 to the Christmas Eve in 1896, when it was burnt down in fire.
