= Kotor =

City in Coastal Montenegro

Kotor Котор
- Town and municipality
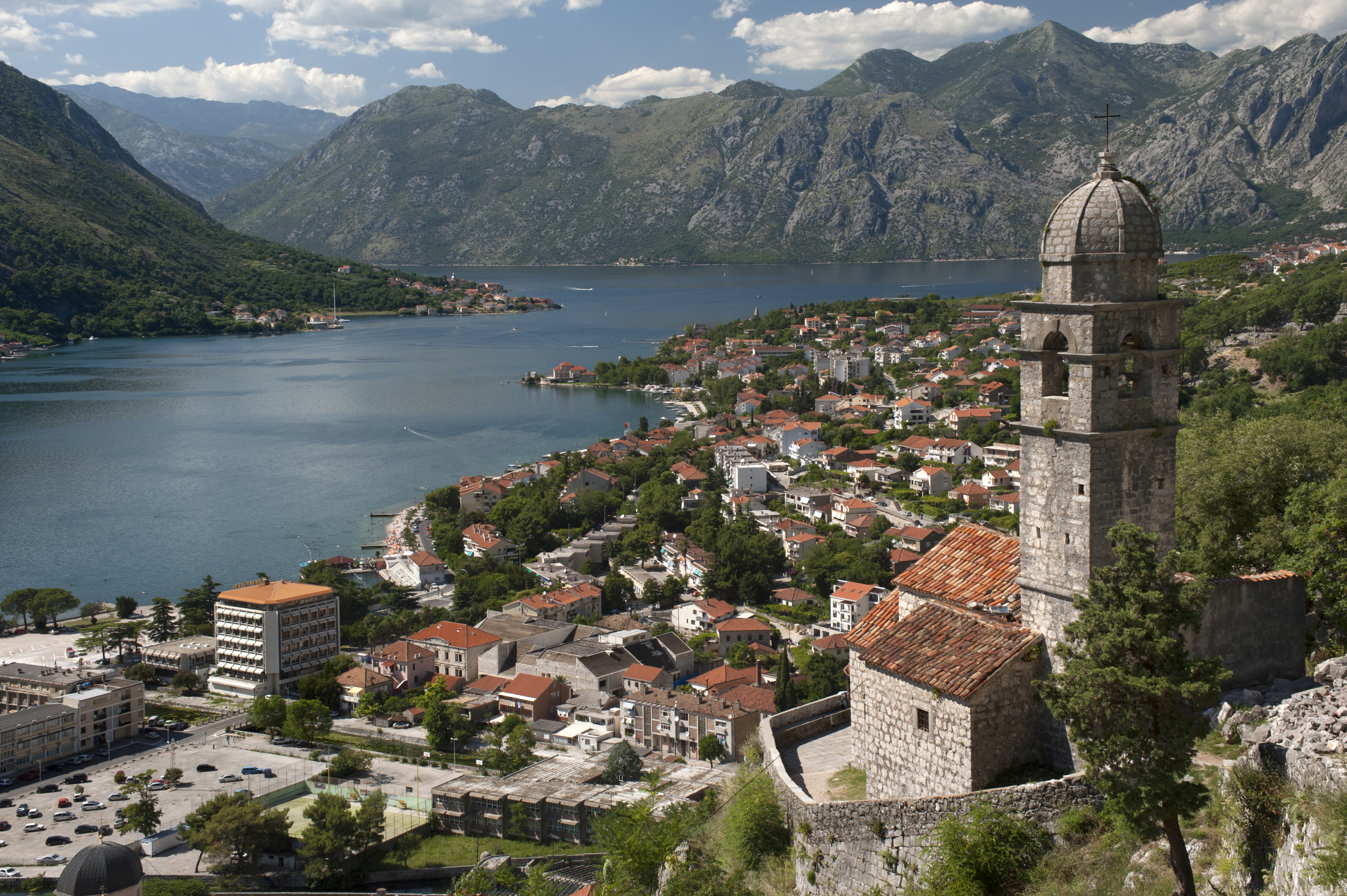
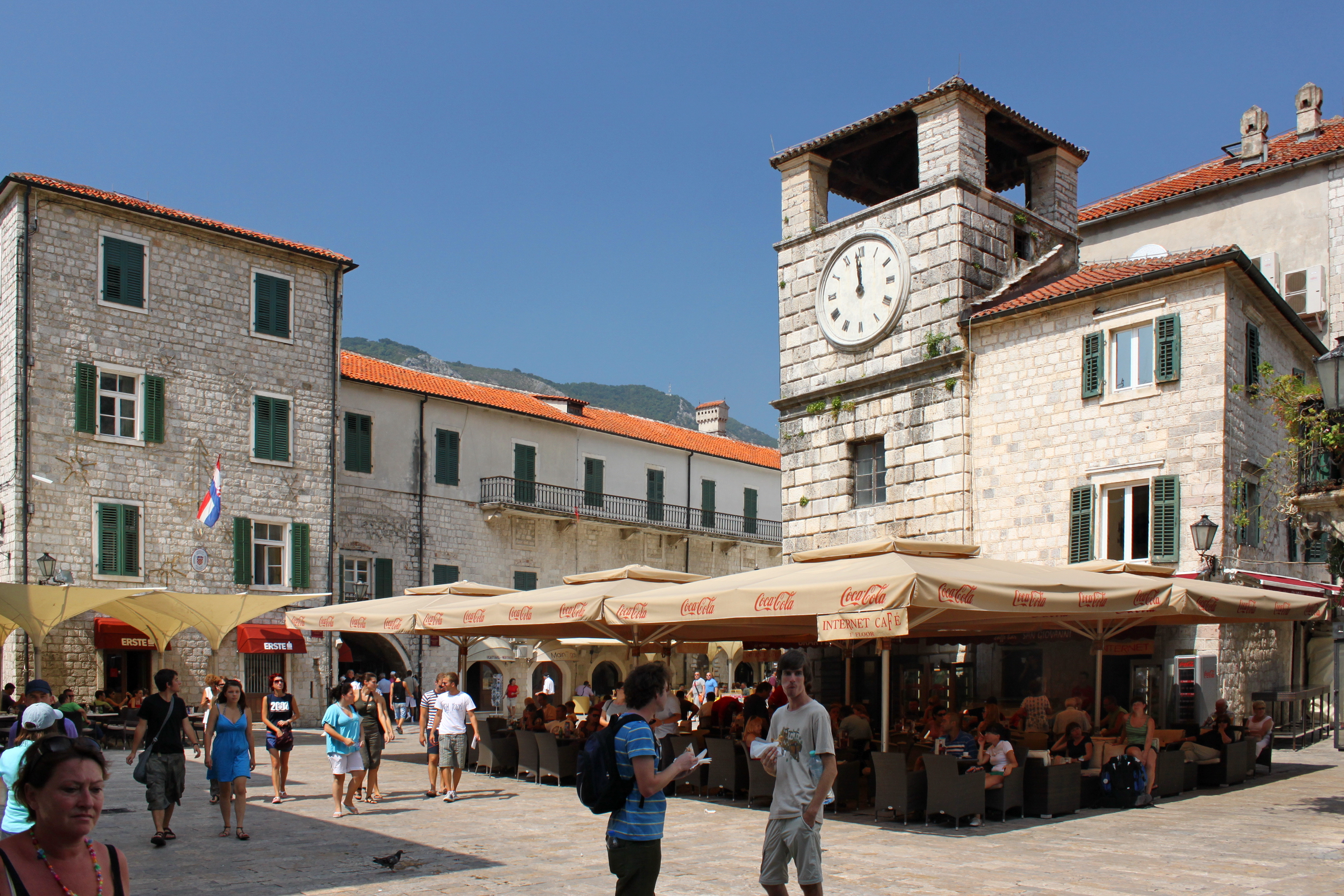
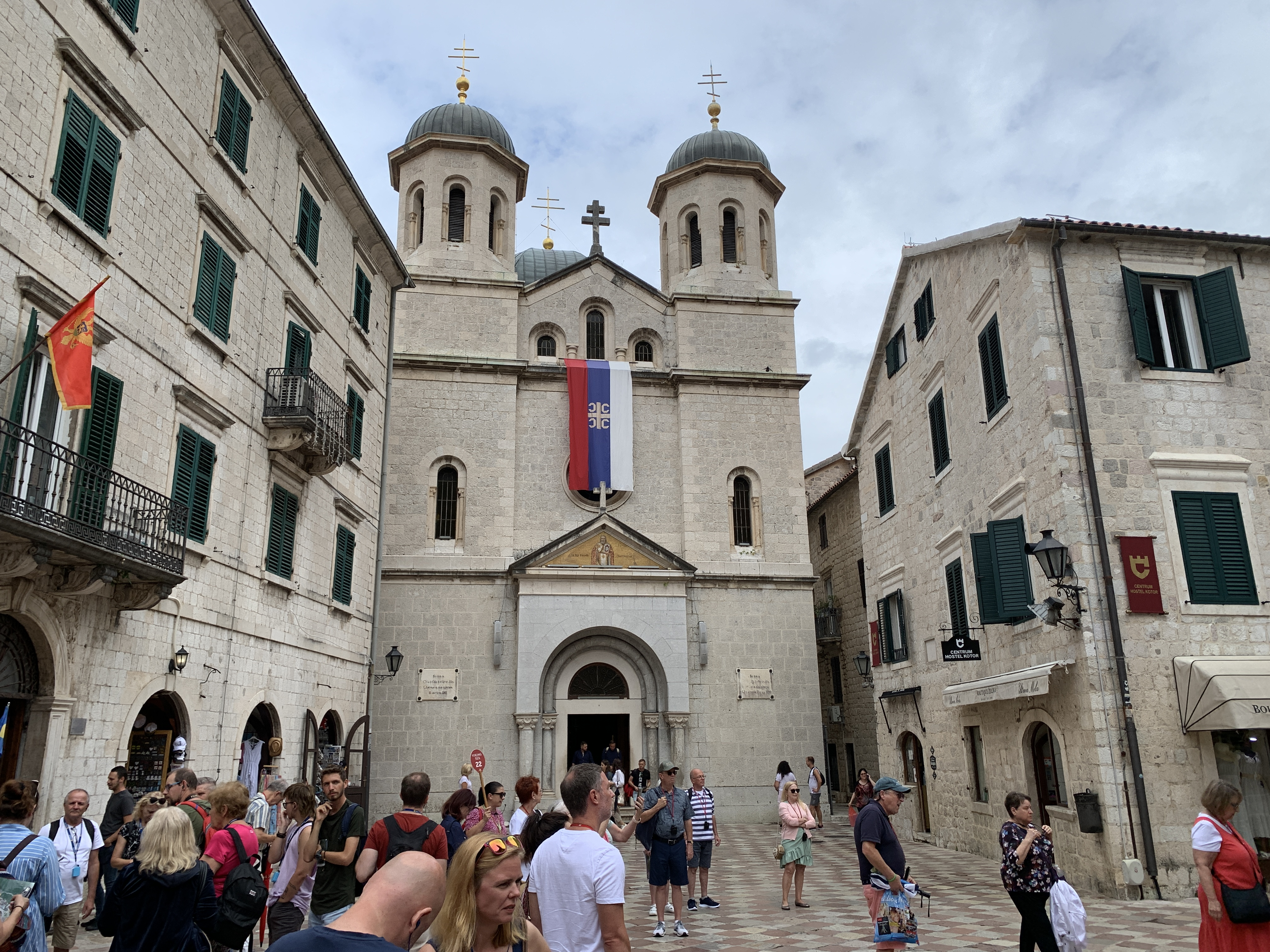
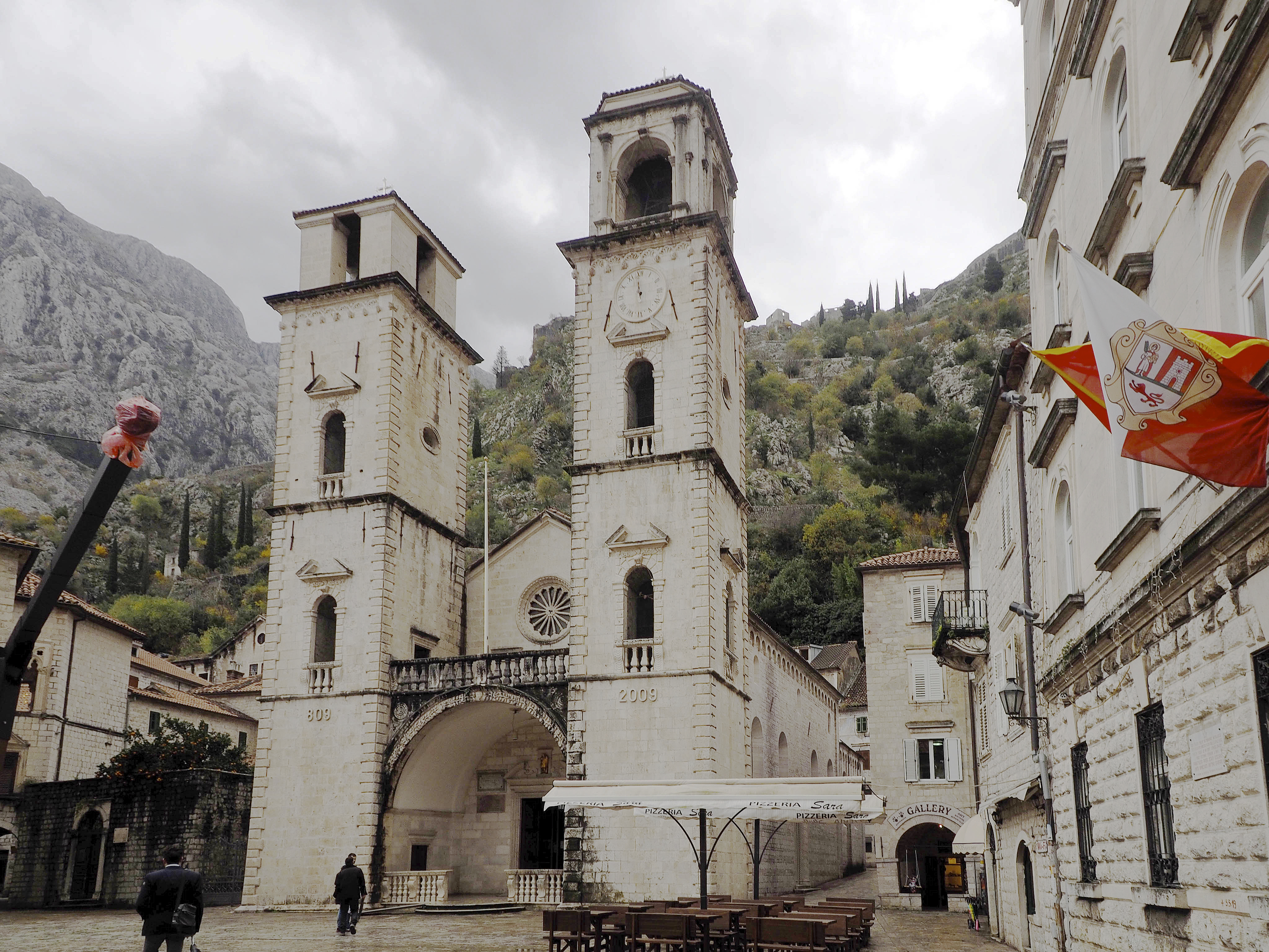
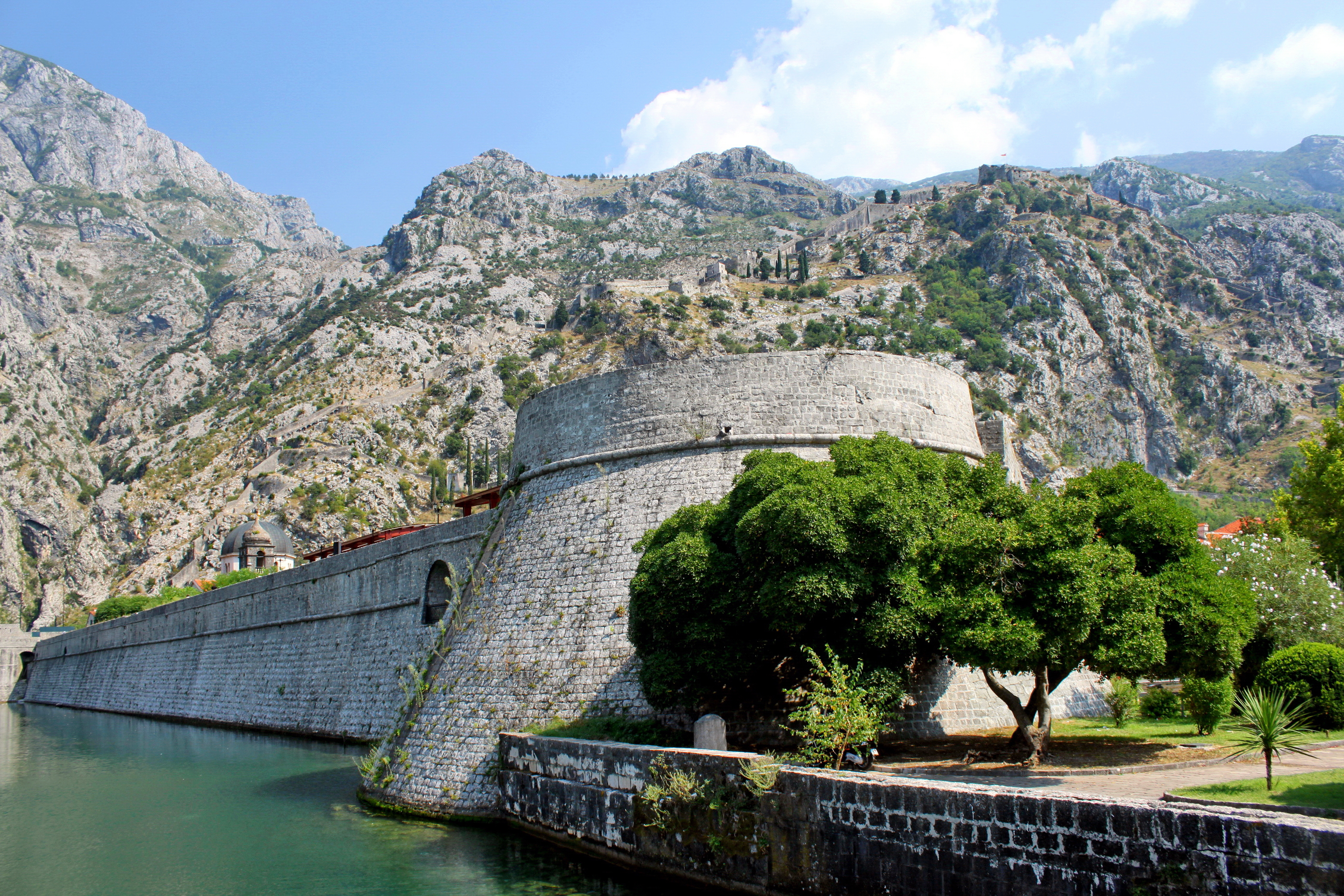
- Panoramic view of Kotor and Kotor Bay Arms Square St. Nicholas Church Kotor Cathedral City Walls

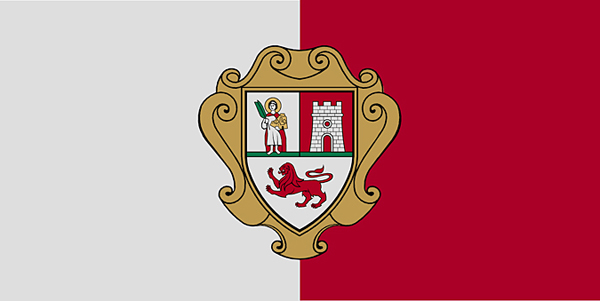
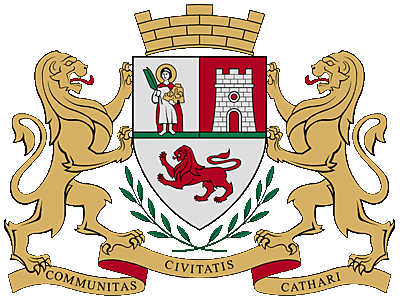
- Flag Coat of arms

- Location within Montenegro
- Coordinates: 42°25′48″N 18°46′12″E
- Country: Montenegro
- Region: Coastal
- Municipality: Kotor
- Founded: 5th century BC

Government
  - Type: Mayor-Assembly
  - Mayor: Vladimir Jokić (DCG)

Area
  - Municipality: 335 km^{2} (129 sq mi)

Population (2023)
  - Urban: 13,347
  - Rural: 8,569
  - Municipality: 21,916
- Time zone: UTC+1 (CET)
  - Summer (DST): UTC+2 (CEST)
- Postal code: 85330
- Area code: +382 32
- Vehicle registration: KO
- Patron saint: Saint Tryphon
- Website: www.opstinakotor.com

UNESCO World Heritage Site
- Part of: Natural and Culturo-Historical Region of Kotor
- Criteria: Cultural: (i)(ii)(iii)(iv)
- Reference: 125ter
- Inscription: 1979 (3rd Session)
- Extensions: 2012, 2015

Kotor (Montenegrin Cyrillic: Котор, pronounced [kɔ̌tɔr]), historically known as Cattaro (from Italian, pronounced [ˈkattaro]), is a town in Coastal region of Montenegro. It is located in a secluded part of the Bay of Kotor. The city has a population of 13,347 and is the administrative center of Kotor Municipality.

The old Mediterranean port of Kotor is surrounded by fortifications built during the Venetian period. It is located on the Bay of Kotor (Boka Kotorska), one of the most indented parts of the Adriatic Sea, which constitutes a ria, meaning a submerged river canyon. Together with the nearly overhanging limestone cliffs of Orjen and Lovćen, Kotor and its surrounding area form the unique landscape.

Since the early 2000s Kotor has seen an increase in tourists, many of them coming by cruise ship. Visitors are attracted to the natural environment of the Bay of Kotor and the old town of Kotor. Kotor is part of the World Heritage Site dubbed the Natural and Culturo-Historical Region of Kotor.

The fortified city of Kotor was also included in UNESCO's World Heritage Site list as part of Venetian Works of Defence between 16th and 17th centuries: Stato da Terra – western Stato da Mar in 2017.

== History ==
Historical affiliations

- Illyria (9th century BCE – 33 BCE)
- Roman Republic (33 BCE – 27 BCE)
- Roman Empire (27 BCE – 476)
- Odoacer's Kingdom of Italy (476 – 493)
- Ostrogothic Kingdom (493 – 535)
- Byzantine Empire (535 – 791)
- Francia (791 – 812)
- Byzantine Empire (812 – 1002)
- First Bulgarian Empire (1002)
- First Bulgarian Empire ( Dioclea) (1003)
- Commune of Cattaro (1003 – 1185)
- Grand Principality of Serbia (1185 – 1217)
- Kingdom of Serbia (1217 – 1346)
- Serbian Empire (1346 – 1371)
- Kingdom of Hungary (1371 – 1382)
- Republic of Venice (1382 – 1384)
- Kingdom of Bosnia (1384 – 1391)
- Commune of Cattaro (1391 – 1420)
- Republic of Venice (1420 – 1797)
- Holy Roman Empire (1797 – 1805)
- First French Empire ( Napoleonic Kingdom of Italy) (1805 – 1810)
- First French Empire ( Illyrian Provinces) (1810 – 1814)
- United Kingdom (1814 – 1815)
- Austrian Empire ( Kingdom of Dalmatia) (1815 – 1867)
- Austria-Hungary ( Kingdom of Dalmatia) (1867 – 1918)
- Kingdom of Yugoslavia (1918 – 1941)
- Kingdom of Italy ( Governorate of Dalmatia) (1941 – 1943)
- Greater German Reich (1943 – 1944)
- SFR Yugoslavia (SR Montenegro) (1944 – 1992)
- FR Yugoslavia ( Republic of Montenegro) (1992 – 2006)
- Montenegro (2006 – present)

=== Early history ===
Once populated by the Illyrians, the exact time of foundation of the first settlement is not known. According to some sources, the oldest settled area dates two millennia back.

The city, first mentioned in 168 BC, was settled during ancient Roman times, when it was known as Acruvium, Ascrivium, or Ascruvium (Ancient Greek: Ἀσκρήβιον : Askrḗbion, Medieval Greek: Ἀσκρήβιον : Askrīvion) and was part of the Roman province of Dalmatia.

=== Middle Ages ===
The city has been fortified since the early Middle Ages, when Emperor Justinian built a fortress above Ascrivium in 535, after expelling the Ostrogoths. Ascrivium was plundered by the Saracens in 840. It was further fortified towards the peak of Saint Ivan by Constantine VII Porphyrogennetos in the 10th century.

It was one of the more influential Dalmatian city-states, initially with a Romance-speaking population, as throughout the early Middle Ages, and until the 11th century the Dalmatian language was still spoken in Kotor. The city was part of Byzantine Dalmatia in that period, and the modern name of Kotor probably originated in the Byzantine name for the city: Dekatera or Dekaderon.

In 1002, the city suffered damage under the occupation of the First Bulgarian Empire, and in the following year it was ceded to Duklja by the Bulgarian Tsar Samuil. Duklja, or Dioclea, was a vassal duchy of the Bulgarian Empire at the time. The local population resisted the pact and, taking advantage of its alliance with Dubrovnik, maintained its high autonomy. Duklja, the biggest Serb duchy at the time, gradually became more powerful under Vojislavljević dynasty and eventually independent from Byzantium in 1040. The city remained autonomous up until Duklja was once again subdued by Byzantium in 1143.

The city was conquered in 1185 by Stefan Nemanja, the ruler of the Grand Principality of Serbia and founder of the Nemanjić dynasty. At that time Kotor was already an episcopal see subordinated to the archbishopric of Bari, and in the 13th century, Dominican and Franciscan monasteries were established to check the spread of Bogomilism. Under the rule of the Nemanjić, Kotor became a partially autonomous city, enjoying many privileges and maintaining its republican institutions. This is evidenced by a statute from 1301, which demonstrates that Kotor had the status of a city under Serbian rule. In the 14th century the commerce of Cattaro, as named in Latin scripts (in Serbian Котор, град краљев/Kotor, grad kraljev/Kotor, city of the King), rivaled that of Republic of Ragusa and other important trading cities in Eastern Adriatic. Kotor remained the most important trading port of subsequent Serb states – Kingdom of Serbia and Serbian Empire, up to its downfall in 1371.

In 1368, the city was attacked by the Balšići, under the rule of Đurađ I.

After the fracturing of the Serbian Empire, the city was taken by the Kingdom of Hungary, only to change hands repeatedly between them and the Republic of Venice in the period between 1371 and 1384. After that, Kotor was held by the Kingdom of Bosnia under Tvrtko I Kotromanić between 1384 and 1391. The king of Bosnia, who claimed the Serbian throne, minted his coins in Kotor.

After the death of Tvrtko in 1391, Kotor became fully independent, until the administration, wary of the looming Ottoman danger, asked Venice for protection. The city acknowledged the suzerainty of Venice in 1420.

=== Venetian rule ===
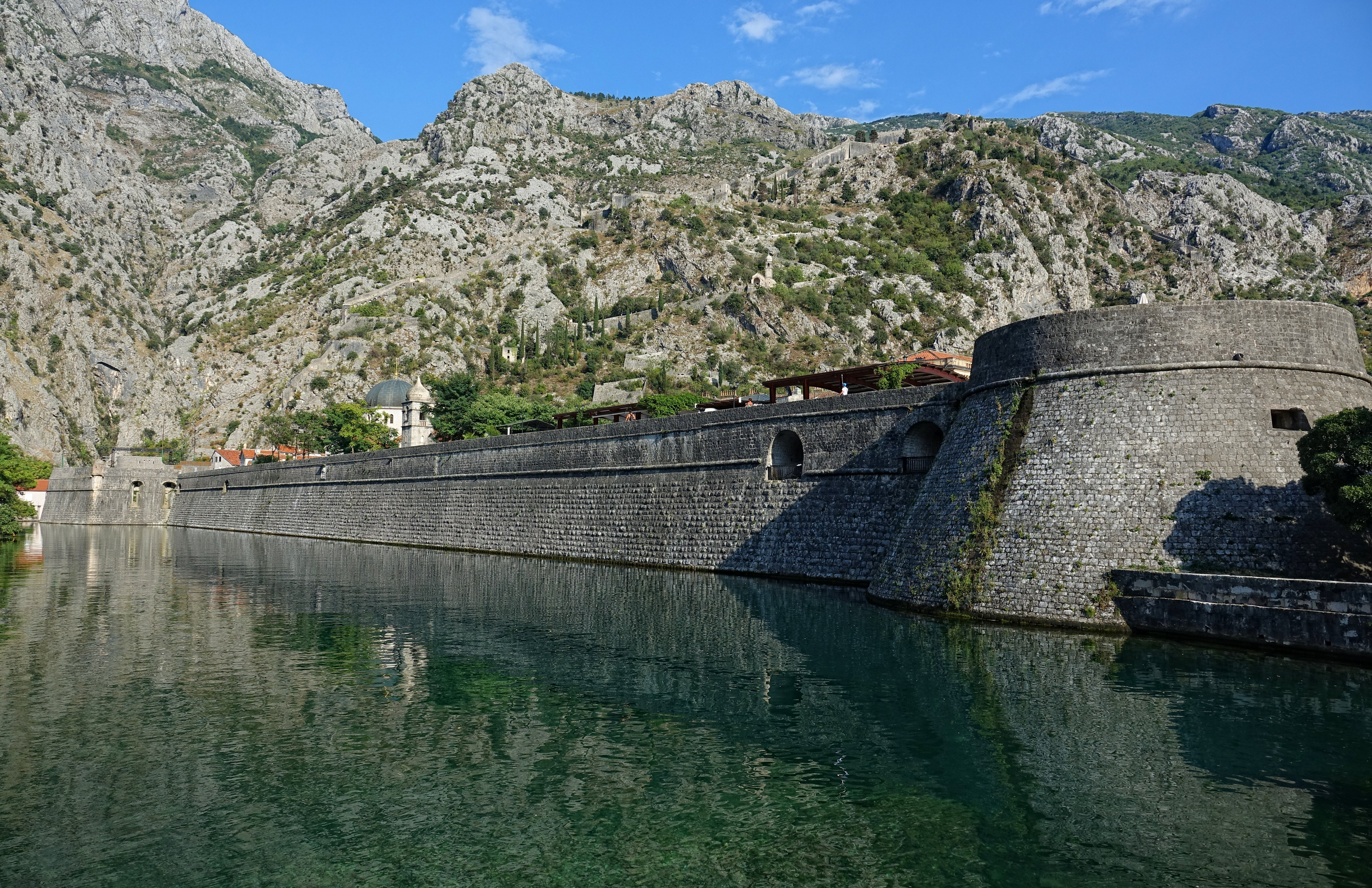
Venetian Fortifications of Kotor, UNESCO site

The city was part of the Venetian Albania province of the Venetian Republic from 1420 to 1797.

Four centuries of Venetian domination have given the city the typical Venetian architecture, that contributes to make Kotor a UNESCO world heritage site.

In the 14th and 15th centuries, there was an influx of settlers from the oblasts of Trebinje (the region around forts Klobuk Ledenica and Rudina) and the Duchy of Saint Sava (Gacko and Dabar) to Kotor. The Italian name of the city is Cattaro. Under Venetian rule, Kotor was besieged by the Ottoman Empire in 1538 and 1657, endured the plague in 1572, and was nearly destroyed by earthquakes in 1563 and 1667.

In the 15th and 16th centuries, the customs of the local administration of Kotor, such as the right of the popolari to elect urban representatives, were unchanged and tolerated by the Provveditore of the city, despite Venetian laws prohibiting such institutions. In 1627, during a dispute between the populari and Kotor's nobility, this right was revoked by the consultare Fulgenzio Micanzio, thus empowering the position of the city's urban elite.

Above the entrance to the old city Kotor, is a stone relief with the emblem of Yugoslavia. Following the socialist revolution, it replaced a stone relief depiciting the Venetian lion of St. Mark.

=== Habsburg and Napoleonic rule ===
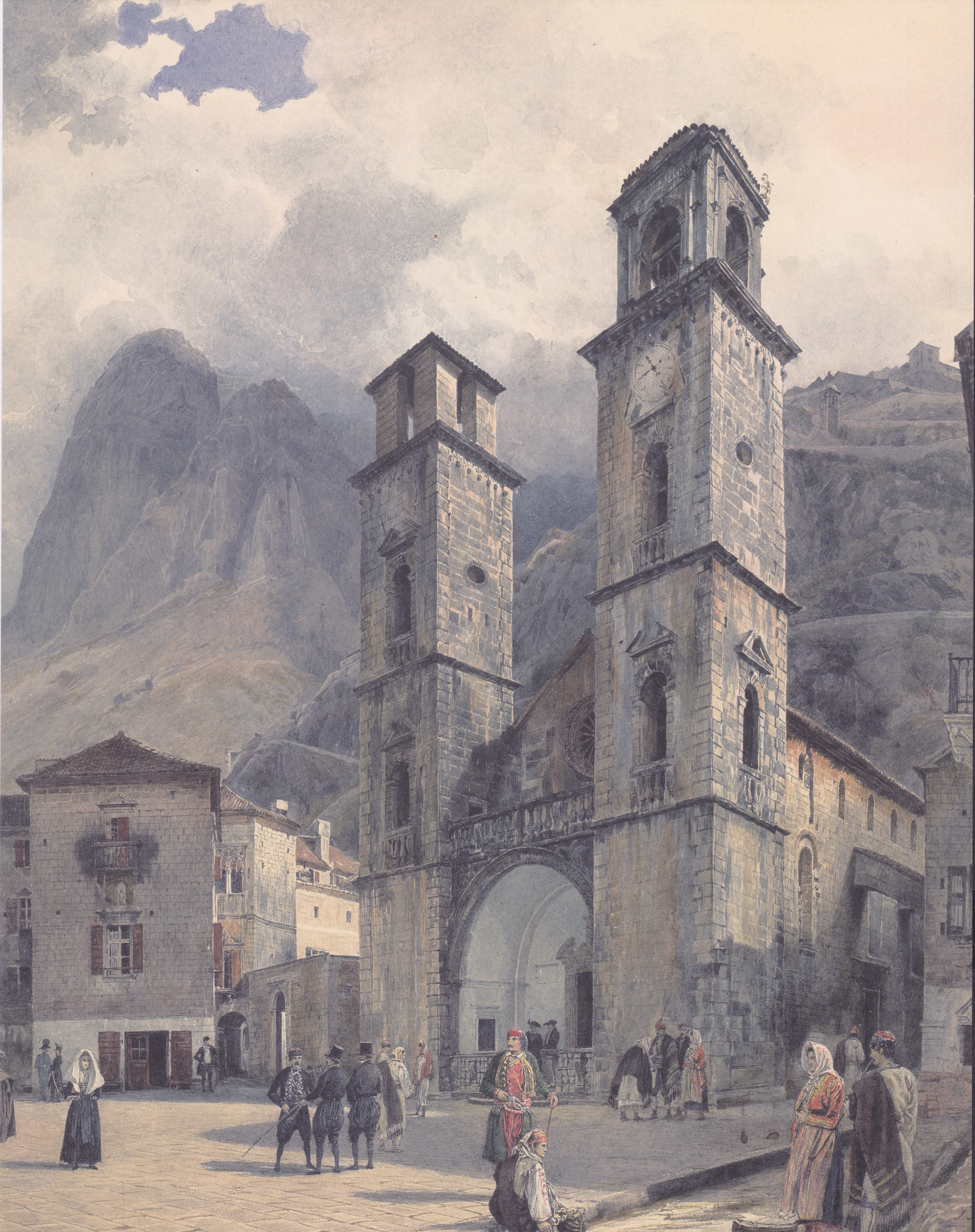
The Cathedral Square in Cattaro depicted by Rudolf von Alt, 1841

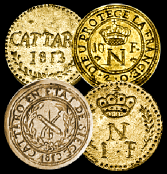
Napoleonic coins were minted in 1813 in Kotor

After the Treaty of Campo Formio in 1797, it passed to the Habsburg monarchy. However, in 1805, it was assigned to the French Empire's client state, the Napoleonic Kingdom of Italy, by the Treaty of Pressburg, although in fact held by a Russian squadron under Dmitry Senyavin. After the Russians retreated, Kotor was united in 1806 with this Kingdom of Italy and then in 1810 with the French Empire's Illyrian Provinces. Kotor was captured by the British in an attack on the Bay led by Commodore John Harper in the brig sloop HMS Saracen (18 guns). To seal off Kotor, residents along the shore literally pulled the ship in windless conditions with ropes. Saracen's crew later hauled naval 18-pounder guns above Fort St. John, the fortress near Kotor, and were reinforced by Captain William Hoste with his ship HMS Bacchante (38 guns). The French garrison had no alternative but to surrender, which it did on 5 January 1814.

It was restored to the Habsburgs by the Congress of Vienna. Until 1918, the town, then known as Cattaro, was head of the district of the same name, one of the 13 Bezirkshauptmannschaften in the Kingdom of Dalmatia.

=== World War I ===
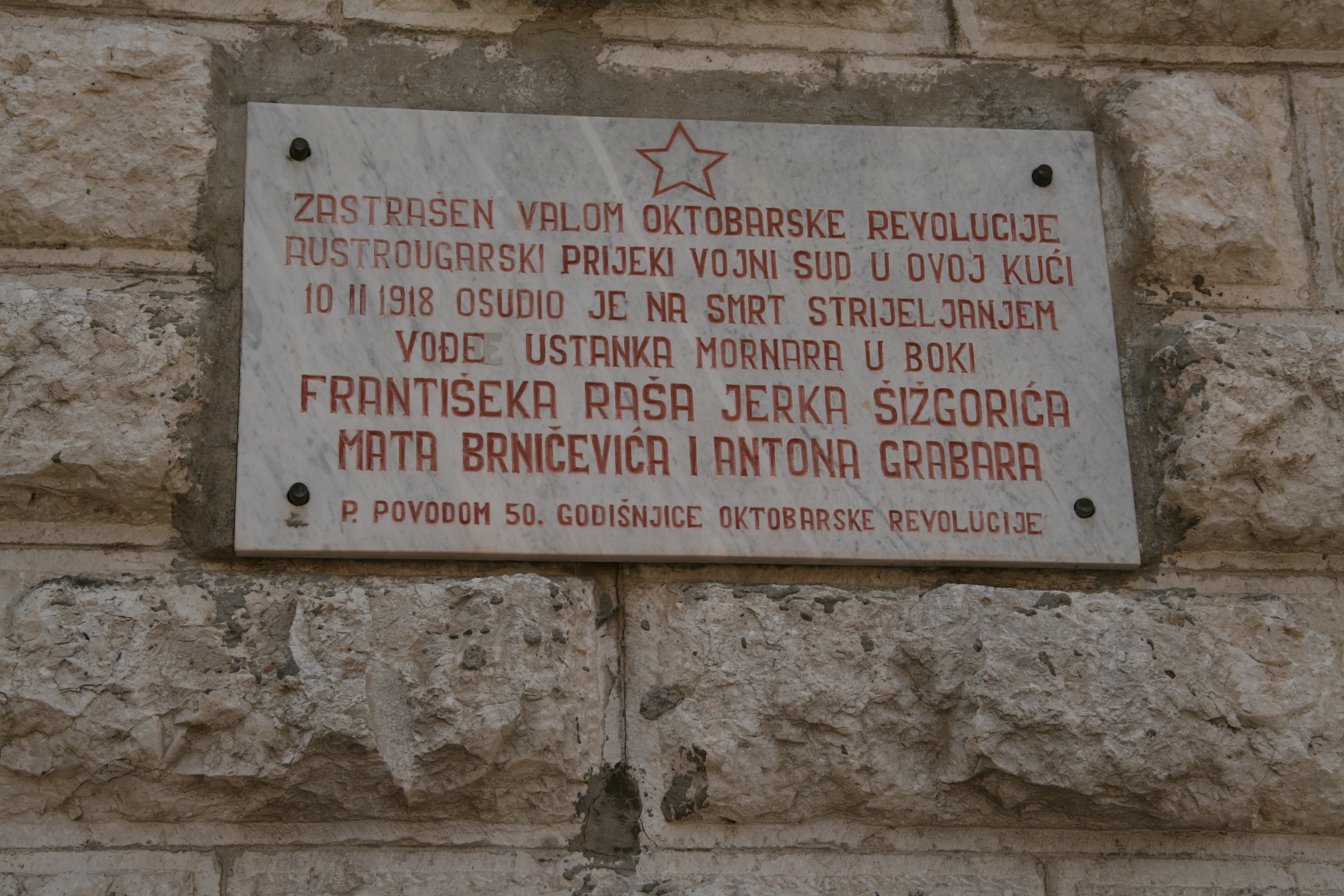
Memorial plaque Cattaro mutiny at Kotor city hall

During World War I, Cattaro was one of three main bases of the Austro-Hungarian Navy, the home port of the Austrian Fifth Fleet, consisting of pre-dreadnought battleships and light cruisers, and a base for Austrian and German submarines. The Cattaro mutiny of sailors of the Austro-Hungarian Navy occurred in Kotor starting on 1 February 1918. The mutiny remained isolated and had to be abandoned after three days due to the arrival of loyal troops. Four sailors were subsequently executed according to naval law.

The area was the site of some of the fiercest battles between local Montenegrins and Austria-Hungary. The city came under the allied occupation of the eastern Adriatic in 1918. After 1918, the city became a part of Yugoslavia and officially became known as Kotor.

=== World War II ===
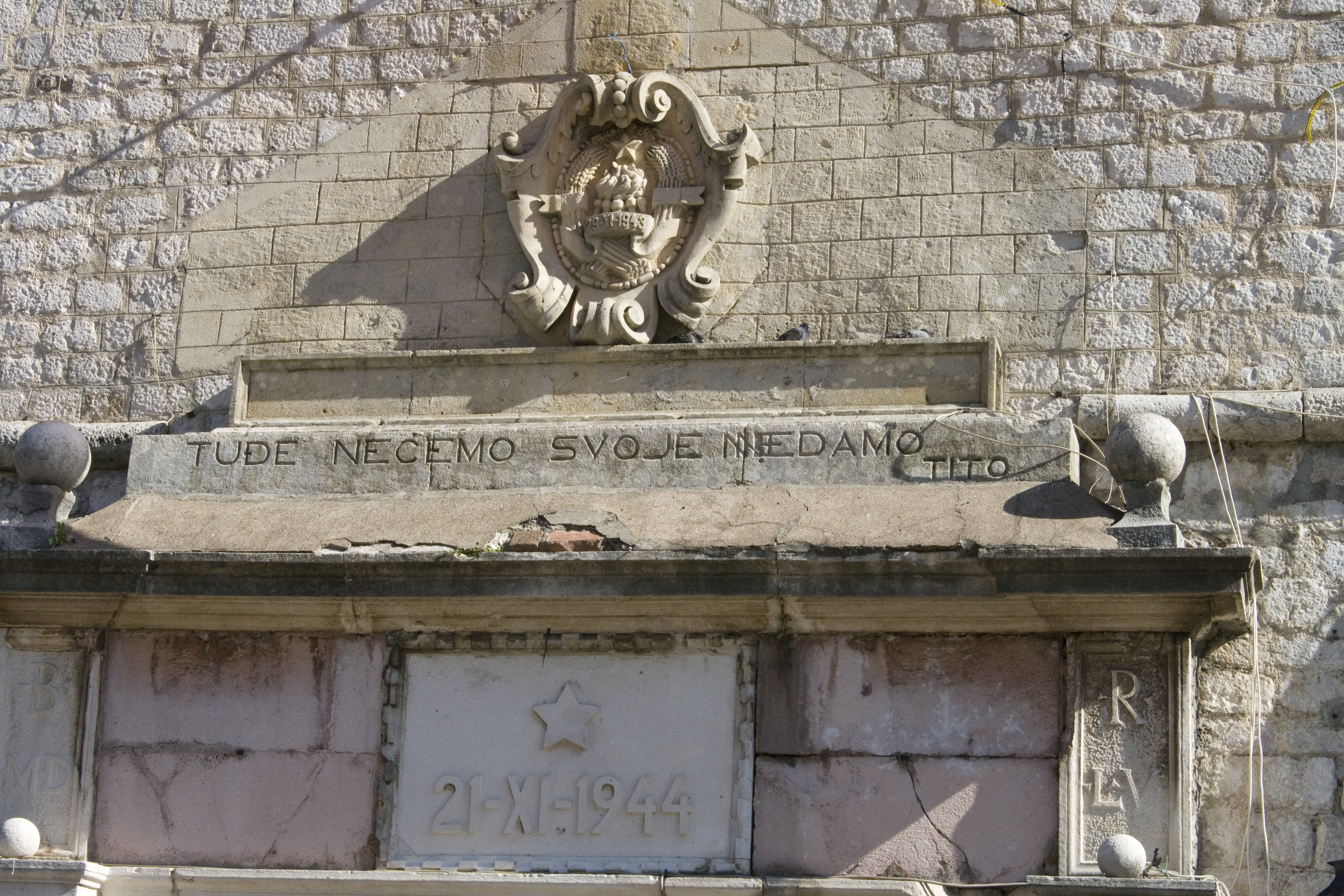
Entrance of old city Kotor with post-World War II sign "What belongs to others we don't want, ours we don't give."

Between 1941 and 1943 the Kingdom of Italy annexed the area of Kotor which became one of three provinces of the Italian Governorate of Dalmatia – the Province of Cattaro had an area (subdivided in 15 "Comuni") of 547 km^{2} (211 sq mi) and a population of 39,800 inhabitants. Most of the city's inhabitants were Orthodox (with some Roman Catholics). After the war the remaining Dalmatian Italians of Kotor (300 inhabitants) left Yugoslavia towards Italy (Istrian-Dalmatian exodus).

== Main sights ==
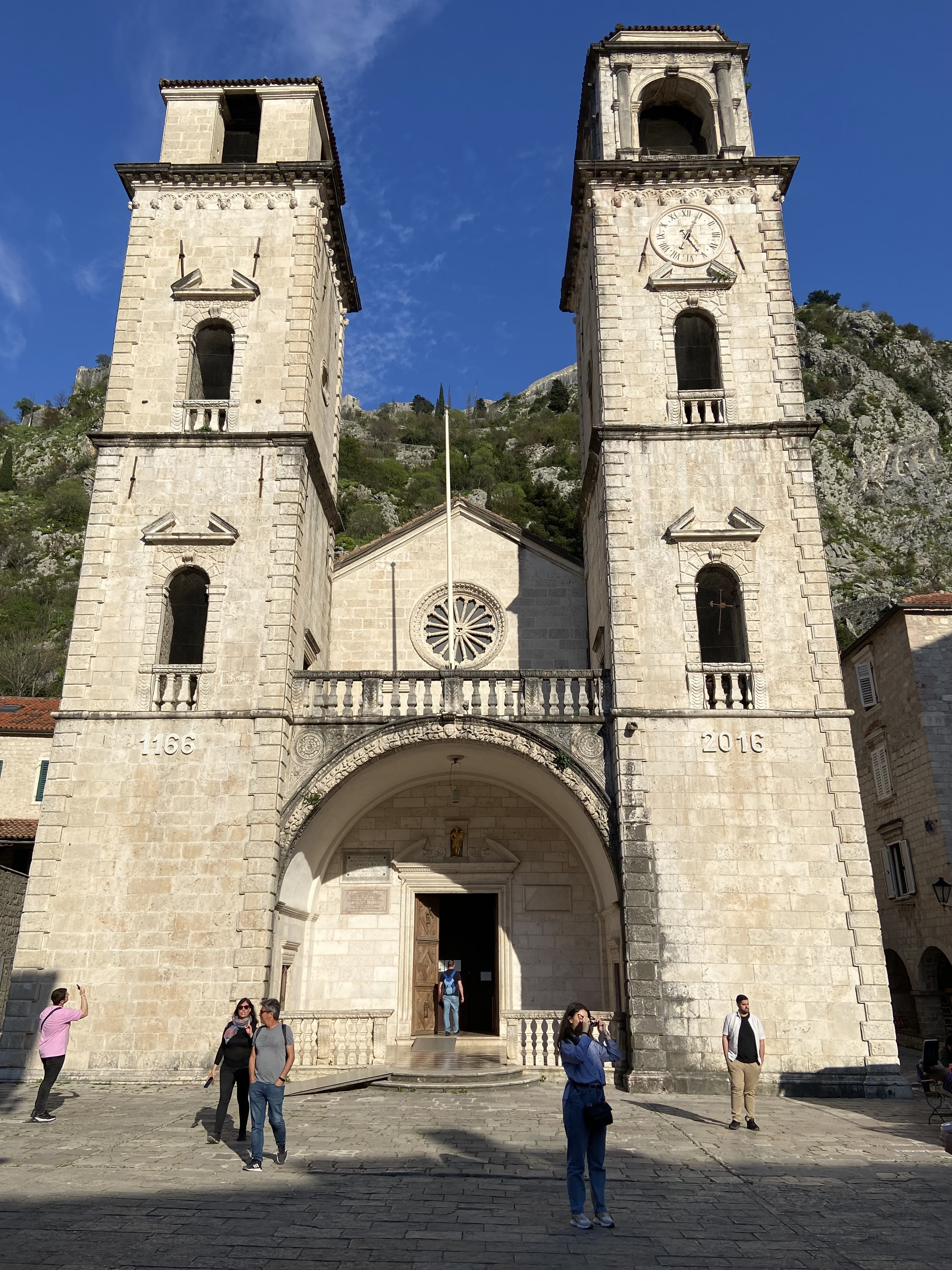
St Tryphon's Cathedral

Kotor has one of the best preserved medieval old towns in the Adriatic and is a double Unesco World Heritage Site: it is part of Natural and Culturo-Historical Region of Kotor and Venetian Works of Defence between the 16th and 17th centuries: Stato da Terra – western Stato da Mar.

It is home to numerous sights, such as the Cathedral of Saint Tryphon in the old town (built in 1166), and the ancient walls which stretch for 4.5 km (3 mi) directly above the city. Sveti Đorđe and Gospa od Škrpijela islets off the coast of Perast are also among the tourism destinations in the vicinity of Kotor.

== Culture ==
Kotor hosts several summer events, such as the Summer Carnival or Bokeljska Noć. Together with Budva, and the small town of Tuzi, near Podgorica, the city hosted the Federation of European Carnival Cities (FECC) World Carnival City Congress in May 2009.

Kotor Festival of Theatre for Children is one of the most important festivals of its kind in Southeast Europe. Thirty years of this manifestation have marked performances by artists from over 30 countries, from 5 continents. It was founded in 1993, not far from the place where the first play for children in the Balkans was performed in 1829. The 2017/18 festival was awarded the EFFE Label by the EFA (European Festivals Association). Kotor Festival is highly regarded in the local community and has a large volunteer base.

Kotor has a large population of cats that have become a symbol of the city. The city has several cat stores and a cat museum, as well as the Cats' Square (Trg od mačaka). Water and food is left throughout the city for the cats to feed on, and cardboard boxes are often arranged to be a place for the cats to sleep in. Tourists may notice cats in poor health, which may be due to malnutrition, lack of shelter, fighting, or illness (often a common viral respiratory condition for which medicine is unavailable). The charity Kotor Kitties exists to try and help the cats of Kotor through spaying and neutering. Kotor is described evocatively at the beginning of Marguerite Yourcenar's story 'Marko's Smile.'

== Demographics ==
Historical population
Year	Pop.	±%
1848	3,550	—
1890	5,400	+52.1%
1900	5,700	+5.6%
1948	14,124	+147.8%
1953	15,436	+9.3%
1961	16,642	+7.8%
1971	18,917	+13.7%
1981	20,455	+8.1%
1991	22,410	+9.6%
2003	22,947	+2.4%
2011	22,601	−1.5%
2023	21,916	−3.0%
Source: pop-stat.mashke.org

Kotor is the administrative centre of Kotor municipality, which includes the towns of Risan and Perast, as well as many small hamlets around the Bay of Kotor, and has a population of 21,916.

The town of Kotor itself has 1,360 inhabitants, but the administrative limits of the town encompass only the area of the Old Town. The urban area of Kotor also includes Dobrota (7,345) and Škaljari (3,342), bringing the population of Kotor's urban area close to 13,000 inhabitants. The total number rises to around 15,000 if the neighbouring hamlets of Muo, Prčanj and Stoliv are included. The entire population of Kotor Municipality was 21,916, as of the 2023 census.

Ethnic composition of the municipality in 2011:

Ethnicity	Number	Percentage
Montenegrins	11,047	48.88%
Serbs	6,910	30.57%
Croats	1,553	6.87%
Other/undeclared	3,091	13.68%
Total	22,601	100%

Throughout history, there was a significant Italian-speaking community in Kotor. Until the 19th century the main language of Kotor was Italian, which then began to decline in favour of Serbo-Croatian. According to the Austrian censuses, there were 623 residents of the central settlement that used Italian as their habitual language (18.7% of the total population) in 1890, and 257 (8.1%) in 1910. The commune as a whole had 646 (11.9%) Italian speakers in 1890, and 274 (4.6%) in 1910. The majority of the Italian population left the city for Italy after the Treaty of Rapallo (1920). In 2011, only 31 people declared themselves as Italians, corresponding to 0.14% of the total population.

In 1848, the population of the city of Kotor itself was 3,550 people, of whom 2,384 were Catholics and 1,157 were Orthodox Christians. However, the Circolo (administrative area) of which Kotor was the capital had a population of 34,326, of whom the majority (24,498) were Orthodox and a minority (9,819) were Catholic. The population of the city proper increased to 5,400 by 1890 and 5,700 by 1900.

According to documents from 1900, Kotor had 7,617 Catholics, and 7,207 Orthodox Christians. Kotor is still the seat of the Catholic Bishopric of Kotor, which covers the entire gulf. In 2011, 78% citizens of Kotor were Orthodox Christians, while 12% were listed as Roman Catholic.

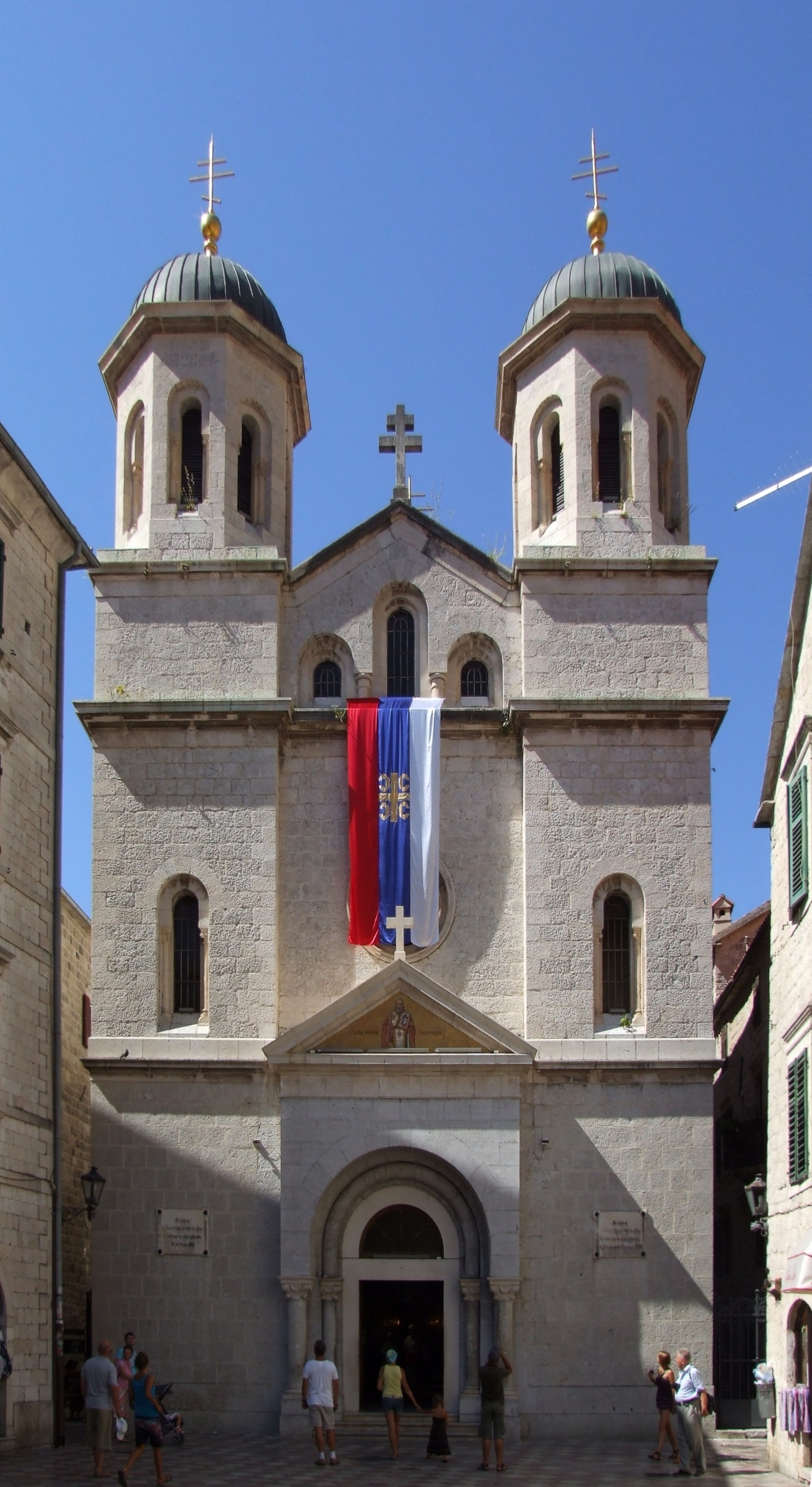
Serbian Orthodox Church of St. Nicholas

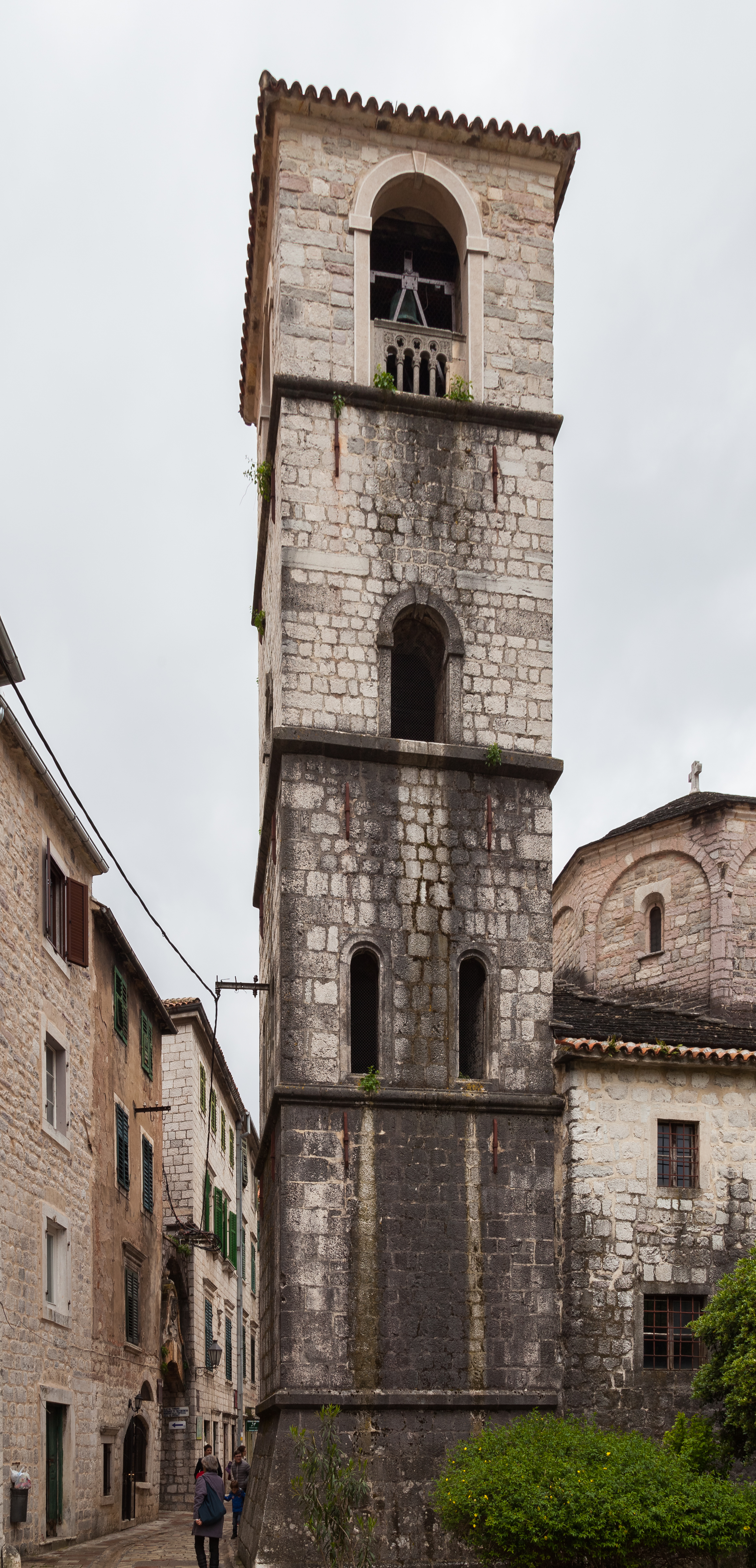
Blessed Ozana Church

Source: Statistical Office of Montenegro – MONSTAT, Census 2011

Religion (2011 Census)	Number
Eastern Orthodoxy	661
Islam	0
Catholicism	197
Other Christians	6
Atheism	30
Undeclared	51
Other	6

== Sports ==
The local football team is FK Bokelj, who have spent several seasons in the country's top and second tiers. They play their home games at the Stadion pod Vrmcem.

Kotor is a national powerhouse of water polo, which is a popular sport in Montenegro. The team of Primorac Kotor won the LEN Champions League in 2009. Another club from Kotor, VA Cattaro, won the 2010 edition of the LEN Euro Cup.

== Transport ==
Kotor is connected to the Adriatic Highway and the rest of the coast and inland Montenegro by Vrmac Tunnel. Inland is reachable by detouring from Adriatic highway at Budva or Sutomore (through Sozina tunnel). There is also a historic road connecting Kotor with Cetinje, which has views of Kotor bay.

Tivat Airport is 5 kilometres (3.1 mi) away, and there are regular flights to Belgrade, Moscow, Paris and London. Dozens of charter planes land daily on Tivat airport during the summer season.

Podgorica Airport is 65 kilometres (40 mi) away, and it has regular flights to major European destinations throughout the year.

== Tourism ==
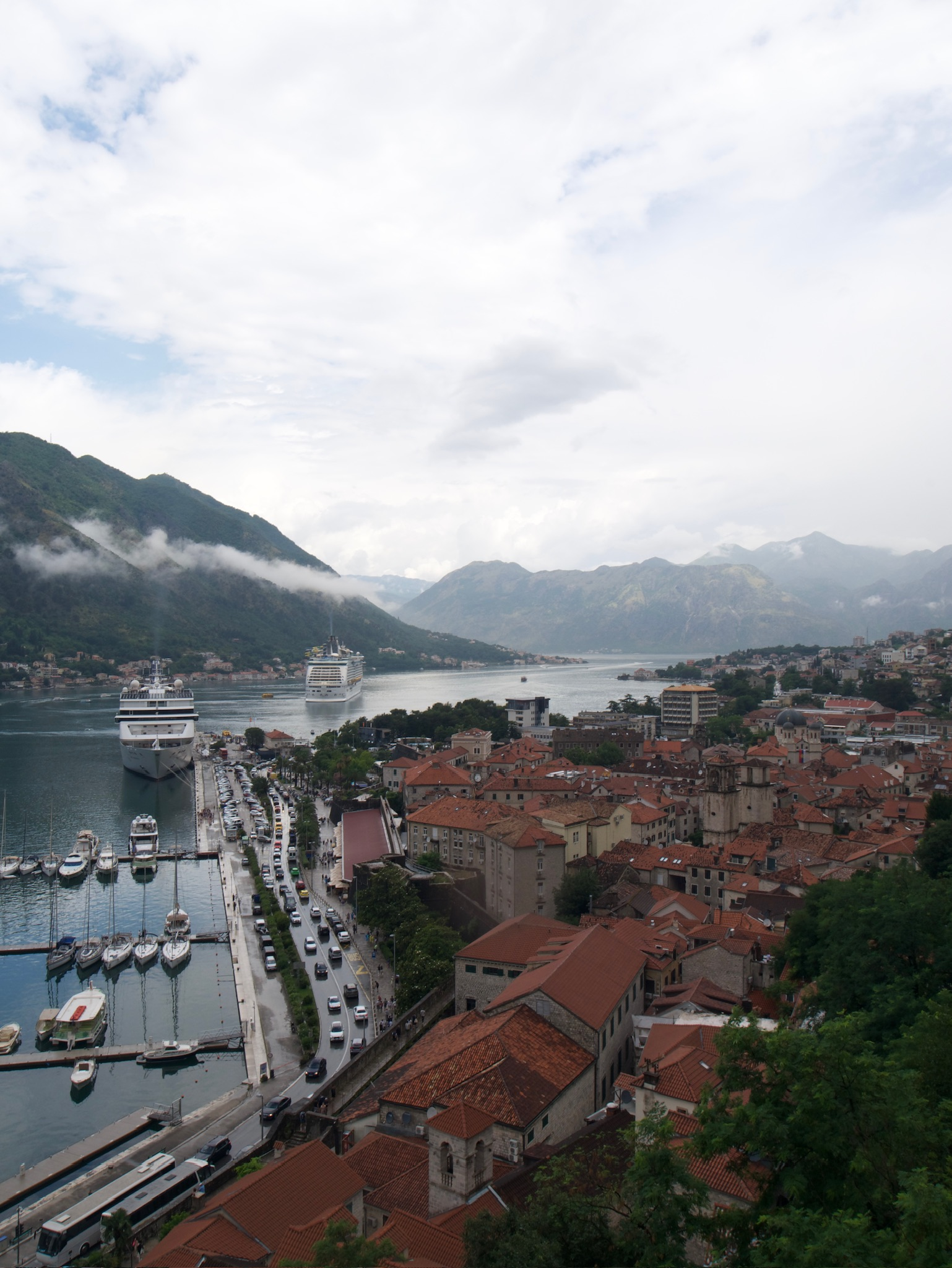
Cruise Ships Arrive at Kotor in June 2024

Kotor is one of the most popular tourist destinations in Montenegro due to its well-preserved medieval architecture. In 2019, it welcomed over 250,000 tourists.

In June 2021, the first and only public aquarium in Montenegro, Aquarium Boka, was opened in Kotor. It is the organizational unit of the Institute for Marine Biology of the University of Montenegro, a unique institution in Montenegro that combines research and education to promote and practice the efficient conservation of marine wildlife. In the first three months, the Aquarium was visited by more than 8,000 people.

Since 2024, the Kotor-Lovćen cable car has become a major attraction, connecting the coastal town to the Lovćen National Park in 11 minutes, offering panoramic views of the Bay of Kotor.

== Twin towns – sister cities ==
Kotor is twinned with:

- Děčín, Czech Republic
- Campomarino, Italy
- Adelfia, Italy
- Nesebar, Bulgaria
- Přerov, Czech Republic
- Santa Barbara, United States
- Stari Grad (Belgrade), Serbia
- Subotica, Serbia
- Szeged, Hungary
- Trogir, Croatia

== Sources ==
- Fine, John Van Antwerp (1994). The Late Medieval Balkans: A Critical Survey from the Late Twelfth Century to the Ottoman Conquest. Ann Arbor: University of Michigan Press. ISBN 978-0-472-08260-5.
