= Mérode Altarpiece =

15th-century painting by the workshop of Robert Campin

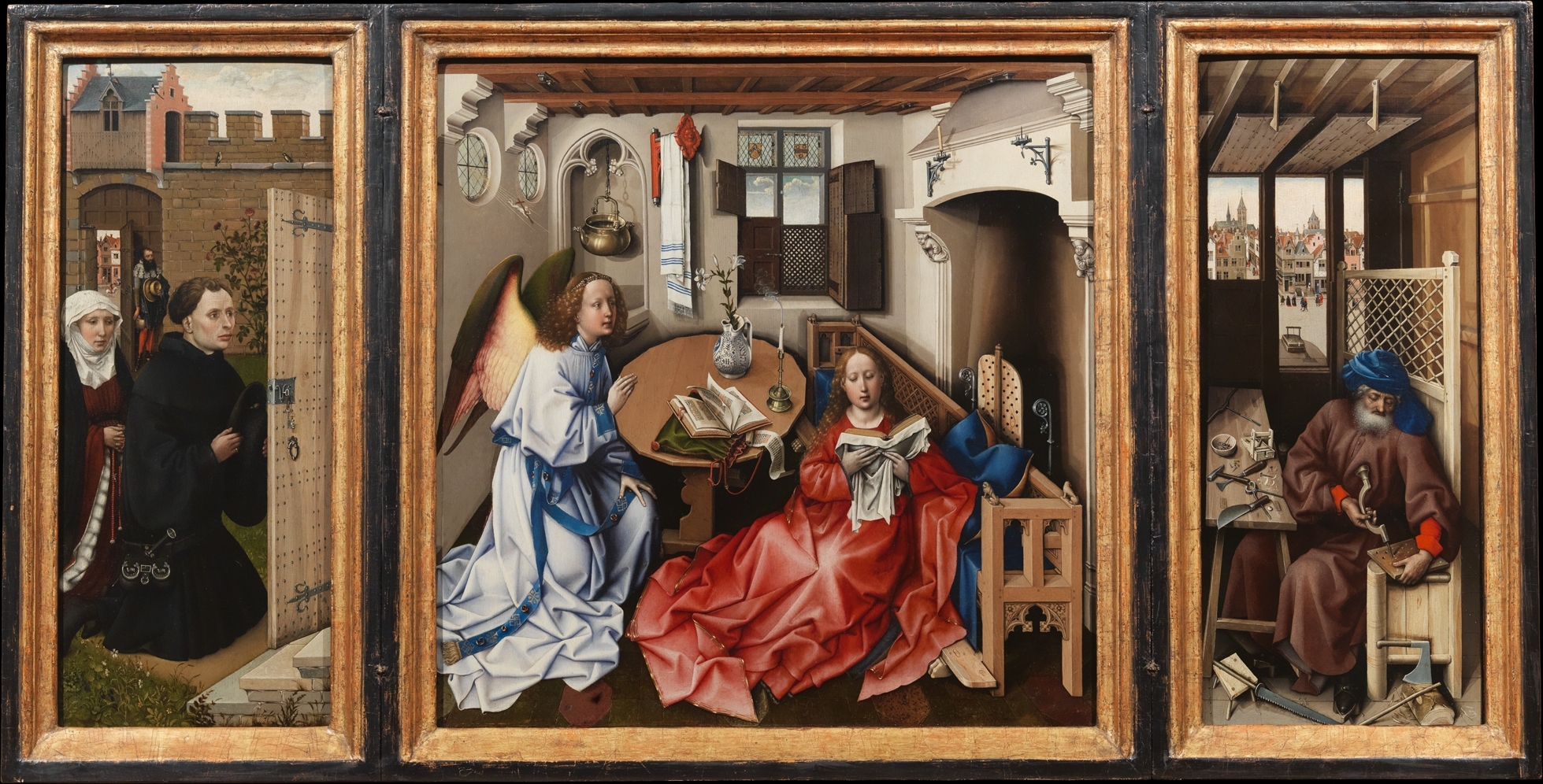
- Central panel: 64 × 63 cm; wings: 65 × 27 cm
- Artist: Robert Campin and workshop
- Year: c. 1422–1432
- Medium: Oil on oak panel
- Movement: Early Netherlandish painting
- Dimensions: 64 cm × 117 cm (25 3/8 in × 46 3/8 in)
- Location: The Cloisters, New York

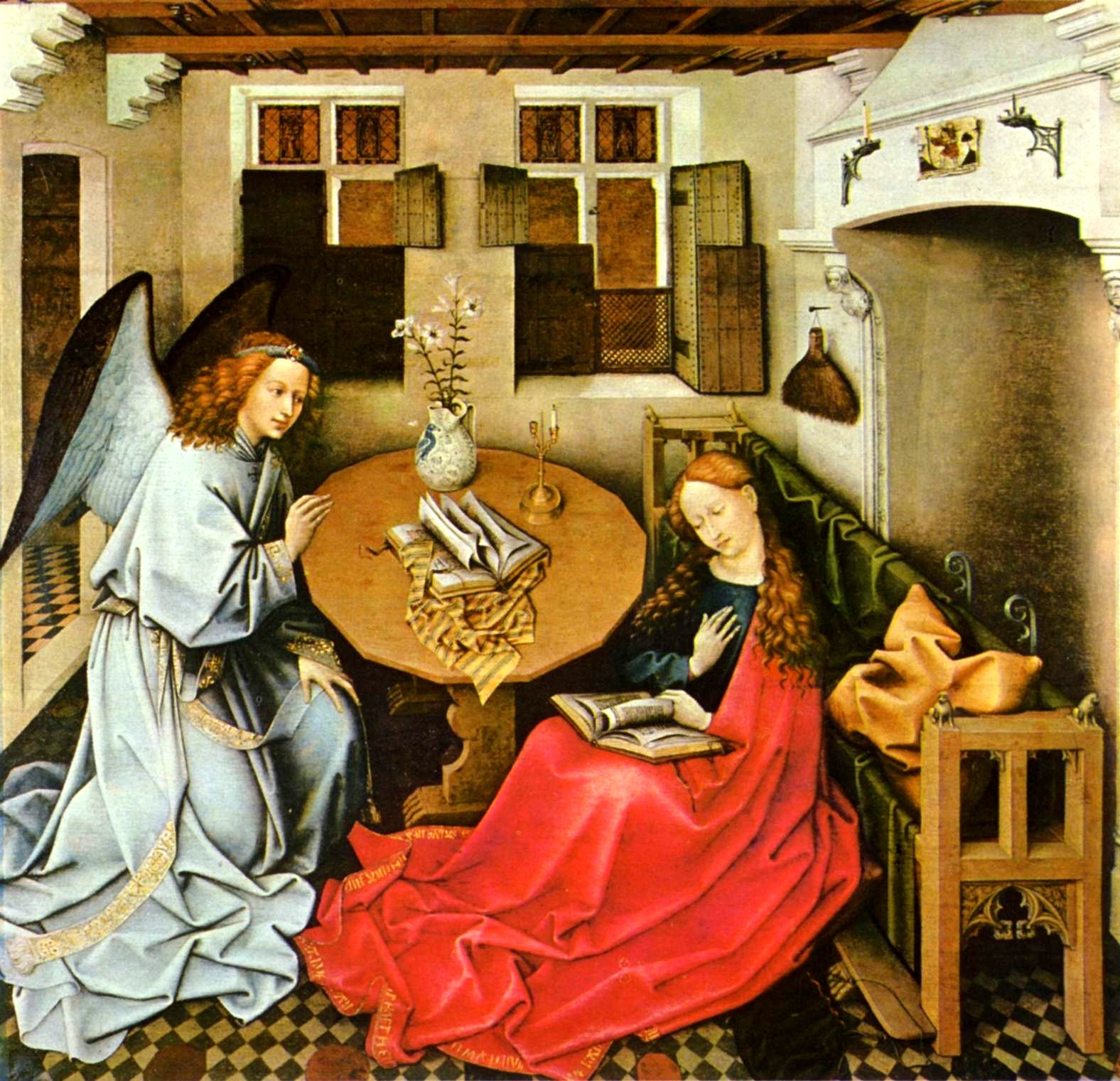
The Annunciation. The Musée des Beaux-Arts, Brussels, version of the central panel, at one time attributed to Jacques Daret, a pupil of Campin's. This panel was painted earlier than the New York version and may be the original.

The Mérode Altarpiece (Note: The triptych is named after a previous owner, comtesse Marie-Nicolette de Merode (1849–1905)) (or Annunciation Triptych) is an oil on oak panel triptych, now in The Cloisters in New York. It is unsigned and undated, but attributed to Early Netherlandish painter Robert Campin and an assistant. (Note: The painting is attributed by the Metropolitan Museum of Art to "Robert Campin and assistant". The "assistant" is attributed with the figure of the female donor, rather than the main subjects) The three panels represent, from left to right, the donors kneeling in prayer in a garden, the moment of the Annunciation to Mary, which is set in a contemporary, domestic setting, and Saint Joseph, a carpenter with the tools of his trade. The many elements of religious symbolism include the lily and fountain (symbolising the purity of Mary), and the Holy Spirit represented by the rays of light coming through from the central panel's left-hand window.

The central panel was completed after 1422, likely between 1425 and 1428, (Note: Dates as early as 1420 have been suggested, based on Campin presumed birth date and that Jan van Eyck's Ghent Altarpiece "Annunciation" was influenced by Campin's treatment of the same subject. See Rousseau (1957), 128) it is thought by a member of Campin's workshop. An earlier version, now in Brussels, may be Campin's original panel. The outer wing panels are later additions by a workshop member, probably on request by the donor who sought to elevate the central panel to a triptych and place himself in the pictorial space. They contain views of the city of Liège, in today's Belgium.

The triptych is a founding and important work in the then emerging late Gothic, Early Netherlandish style, and has been described as a "milestone between two periods; it at once summarizes the medieval tradition and lays the foundation for the development of modern painting".

== Dating and attribution ==
The attribution of the New York triptych has been the subject of wide scholarly debate. It seems to have been completed the same year as the Ghent Altarpiece, in 1432, making the painter a contemporary of Jan van Eyck. It is usually accepted as belonging to a group of paintings associated with the Master of Flémalle, assumed to be Robert Campin. For a time it was attributed to Campin's apprentice Rogier van der Weyden based on the realistic style that would become van der Weyden's hallmark. There is another version of the Annunciation panel in Brussels, slightly earlier but damaged, which may represent the original version by Campin.

Technical examination of the wood panels suggests that the triptych was completed by multiple hands. The wood of the central panel is different and earlier than that of the wings, while the hinging further suggests that the central panel was not intended as part of a triptych. The central panel is likely a copy of an earlier composition by Campin, while the wings were probably a later commission from the donor to attach to the main panel to form a small private devotional altarpiece. Areas of the panels have been reworked; both the female donor and the bearded man on the left wing were painted over the landscape, while the window behind the Virgin was originally painted in gold.

Campbell is not convinced by the association with Flémalle group, and thus Robert Campin. He describes the Mérode as "incoherent in design", lacking Campin's usual trait of spatial continuity, as found in the Seilern Triptych. The open sky as seen through the central panel windows is incongruous in point of view with the street scene in the donor panel. Campbell highlights poor command of perspective in the donor panel, and observes that it is "unfortunate that a line of one of the mortar courses in the garden wall disappears into the donor's mouth". Campbell describes the wing panels as pedestrian and the product of lesser hands. He gives prominence to the Brussels panel, which he cautiously attributes to the Master of Flémalle.

== Description ==
The triptych is relatively small, indicating that it was commissioned for private, domestic use; the central panel measures 64 × 63 cm and each wing is 65 × 27 cm. The panels share a very steep perspective, in which the viewer seems to look down on the figures from an elevated vantage point. In other respects, the perspective is underdeveloped; neither the Virgin nor Gabriel seem to rest on solid ground, while the female donor appears to hover and appears to be barely able to fit within the space she is positioned in.

The panels are in good condition, with minimal overpainting, glossing, dirt buildup, or paint loss. They are almost entirely in oil, and establish many of the inventions that were to make the technique so successful and adaptable over the following centuries. The serenity of the works is achieved, in part, through the dominance of pale, opaque white, red, and blue hues. The size of the panels and the at times minute attention to detail are similar to the focus of contemporary miniatures, as seen in the two illuminated manuscripts in the central panel.

=== Annunciation ===
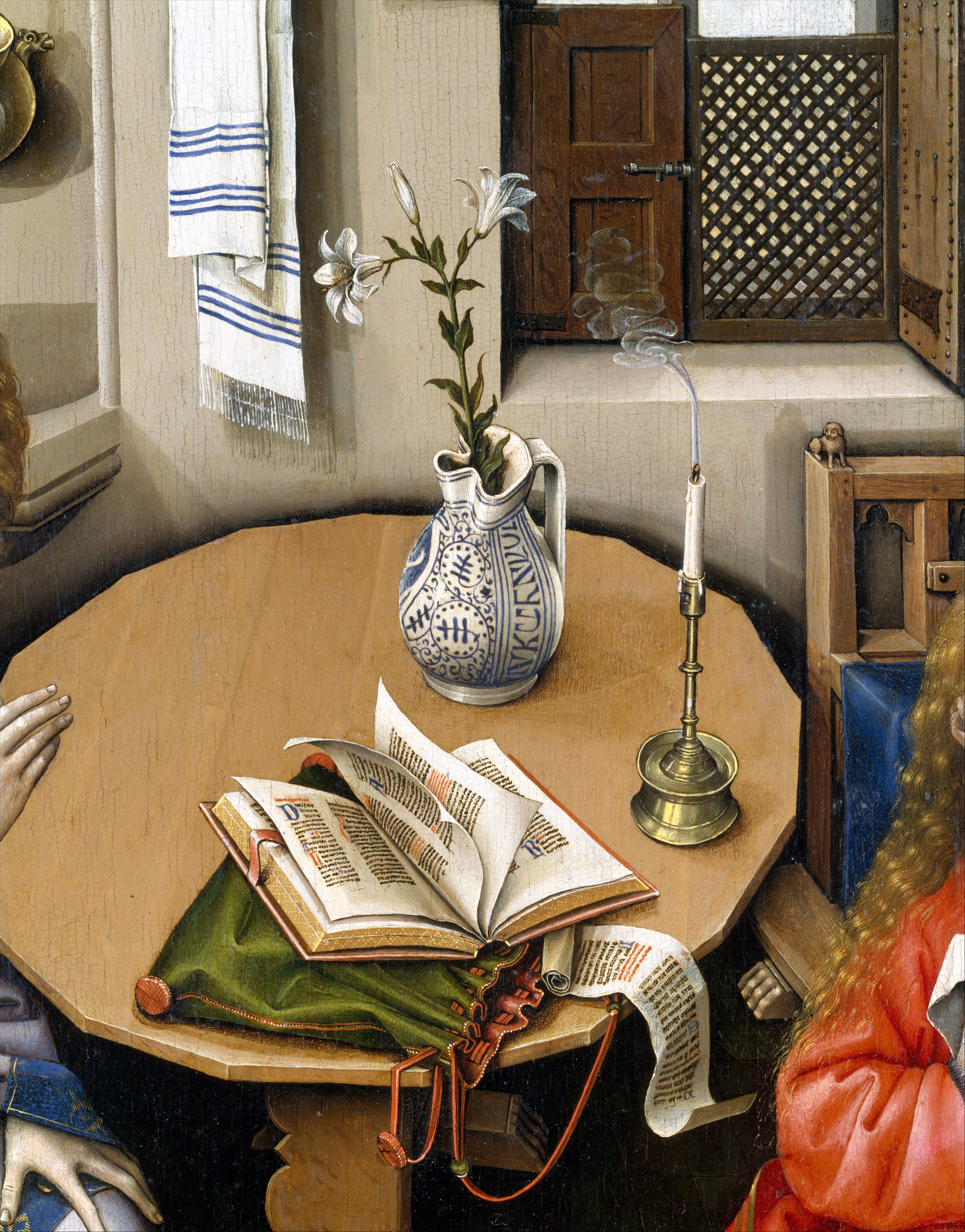
Detail, centre panel, with table, book of hours, fading candle and vase

The panel is one of the earliest representations of the Annunciation to Mary in a contemporary Northern European interior, which appears to be a dining room. This is Campin's main innovation, showing a reading Madonna, with unbound hair in a familiar setting, an image that lead to many adoptions, most famously Rogier van der Weyden's Reading Magdalen. The colors in the upper part of the central panel are dominated by the cool grays of the plaster and the brown of the timber wall, while the lower half is mostly of warmer and deeper brownish greens and reds. Art historians suggest that the success of the panel is due to the contrast between the warm reds of the Virgin's robe and the pale blue hues of the archangel Gabriel's vestment.

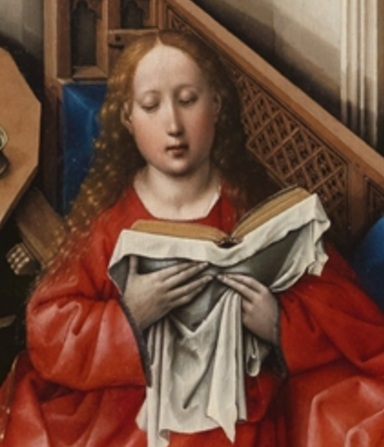
Detail with the Virgin reading a book of hours

The panels' perspective is unusually steep and unevenly distributed. The angle of the table, in particular, is illogical. Art historian Lorne Campbell describes these distortions as "disturbing".

It shows the moment before the traditional Annunciation scene, when Mary is still unaware of the presence of Gabriel. She is in a red gown rather than the more usual blue, and in a relaxed pose, reading from a book of hours, with her hair unbound. Unusually for a medieval depiction of the Annunciation, the dove of the Holy Spirit is not visible. Instead, he is represented by the extinguished light of the candle, and the beam of light falling from the window to the left, which carries the Christ Child holding a cross. The Christ Child flies down towards Mary from the left oculus, signifying her impregnation by God the Father. He gazes directly at her and holds a cross. The folding table contains a recently extinguished candle, and shows coiling smoke and a still glowing wick. This may be a reference to the Holy Spirit, who, according to some late medieval writers, descended to the apostles "like a puff of wind".

The white lily in a Tuscan earthenware jug on the table represents Mary's virginity and purity, as does the white, ocher towel. The jug contains a series of enigmatic letters in Latin and Hebraic, deciphered by some art historians as De Campyn, which they presume as the artist's signature. An open manuscript is placed on the green velvet book pouch. Unusually, the book is positioned next to the Virgin rather than on the shelf. The pages seem worn and handled, indicating that it has been well read. It has been suggested that the book reflects the Carthusian Ludolf of Saxony's idea of the secluded life of the Virgin - that she earlier lived with "the Holy Scriptures as her sole companion".

The right hand half of the back wall holds three windows, one of which contains a lattice screen. The beams of the ceiling are supported by a series of corbels. The sky visible through the windows is a later addition, which was painted over an earlier gold ground. The armorial shields are also later additions.

=== Donors ===
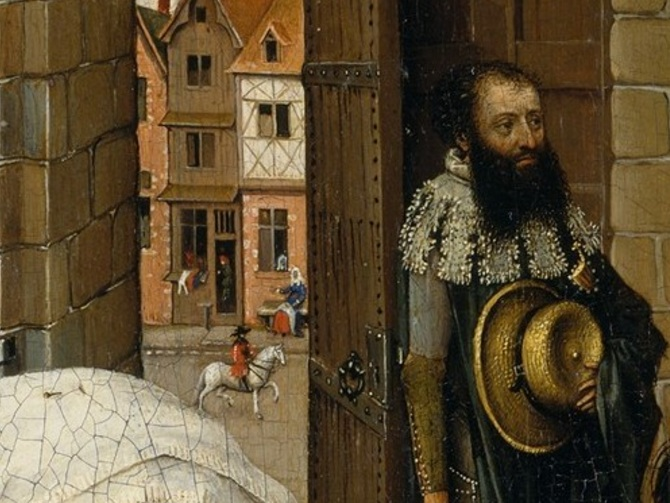
Left panel, with street scene and attendant

The donor and his wife are shown kneeling in prayer are in the left panel, looking through a half-open door into the Virgin's Hortus conclusus. The door presents a continuity oddity; although it can be seen opening into the Virgins room from the left panel, no such door entrance is visible in the center panel. Addressing this, the art historians Rose-Marie and Rainer Hagen suppose that the donor is "imagining that she has entered into his house. From without, he has opened the door; with his own eyes he beholds the Mother of God and petitions her for a family".

The attendant dressed in a festive outfit is by a later artist; perhaps it was added after the donor's marriage. The left-hand space contains an unlocked entrance leading to a minutely detailed street scene. The panel is the more striking as the door leading into the Virgin's chamber is wide open, hugely presumptuous for even a mid-fifteenth century commission, and suggesting access to the gates of heaven.

The donors are identifiable as bourgeoisie from nearby Mechelen, and are documented in Tournai in 1427, identifiable from the coat of arms in the stained glass window of the central panel.

It is assumed that this panel was a later commission to Campin's workshop, not part of the original single-panel design. There has been speculation that it was completed by the young Rogier van der Weyden.

The altarpiece was commissioned either by the businessman Jan Engelbrecht, or the Cologne-born merchant Peter Engelbrecht and his wife Margarete Scrynmaker. Engelbrecht translates from German as "angel brings", while Scrynmaker means "cabinet maker", the latter perhaps influencing the choice of Joseph in the right hand panel.

=== Joseph ===
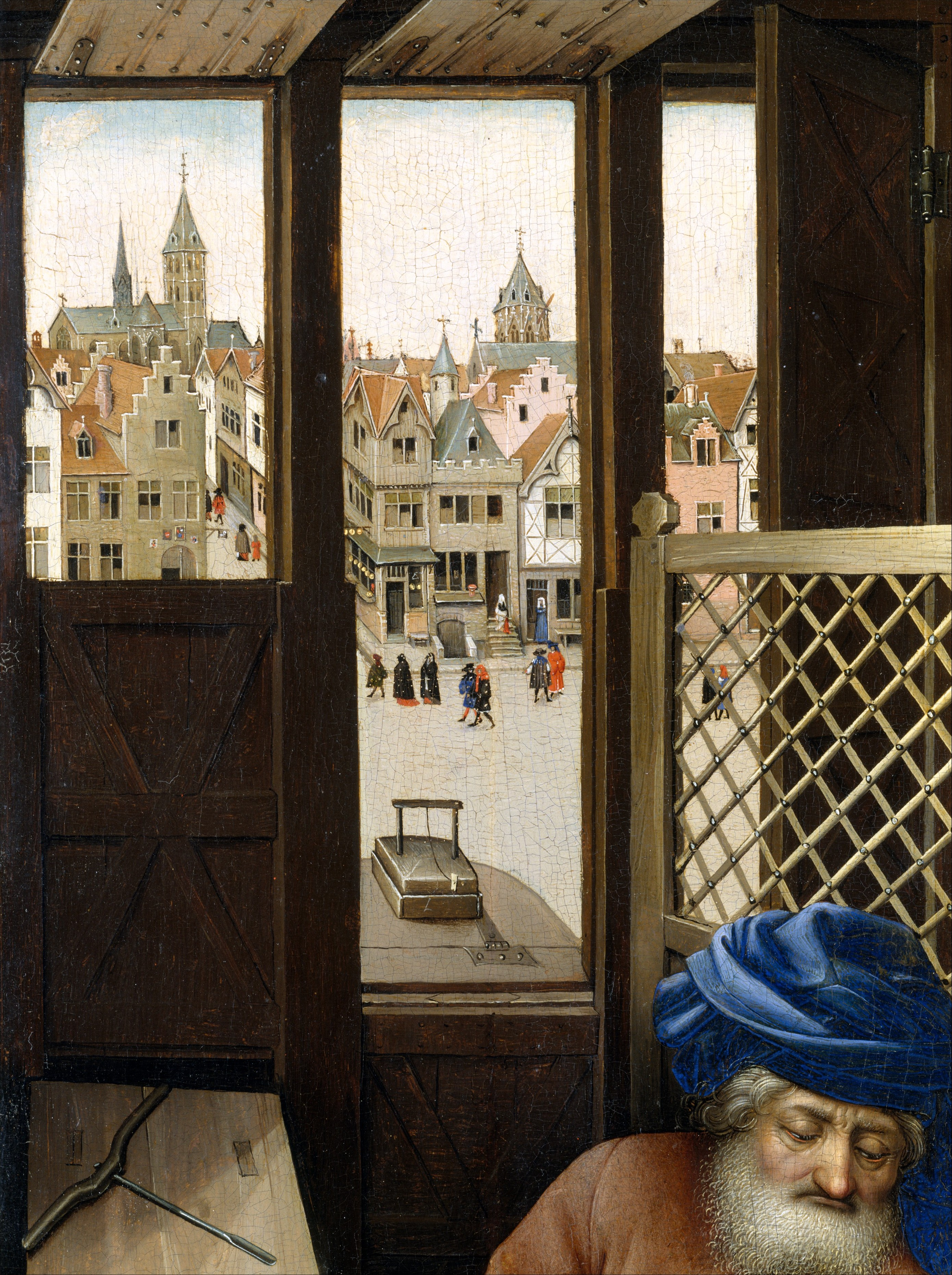
Right panel, detail with street scene and view of Liège

Saint Joseph, a carpenter by trade, occupies the right-hand panel. He is shown at work, boring spike holes into one of the instruments of the Passion. An unusual feature is that, although Mary and Joseph did not marry until after the Annunciation, they are apparently living together and sharing the same space. Joseph is shown with the tools of his craft, visible implements include an ax, saw, rod, and a small footstool sitting before a fire of burning logs. Joseph's presence may be intended to invoke 10 :15 from the Book of Isaiah: "Shall the ax boast itself against him that heweth therewith? or shall the saw magnify itself against him that shaketh it? as if the rod should shake itself against them that lift it up, or as if the staff should lift up itself as if was it were no wood." Isaiah's words were intended as incentatory and revolutionary, were followed by a treatise for the salvation of Israel, and protested against an Assyrian king he considered boorish and vainglorious. Given this, Joseph is seen by art historians as a reassuring presence, warding the devil from the center panel.

Joseph is presented as a relatively old man wearing an eggplant coloured coat and blue turban, in a panel dressed by dark and warm colours, framed by shadows thrown from the window shutters. He works on a mouse trap, probably a symbol of the cross at the Crucifixion, in that it represents an imagined but literal capture of the Devil, said to have held a man in ransom because of the sin of Adam. In some scripts, Christ's naked flesh was served as bait for the devil; "He rejoiced in Christ's death, like a bailiff of death. What he rejoiced in was, in turn, his own undoing. The cross of the Lord was the devil's mousetrap; the bait by which he was caught was the Lord's death."

Irving Zupnick suggested in 1966 that the object in the painting was not a mousetrap but a carpenter's plane. To prove that wrong, John Jacob of the Walker Art Gallery, Liverpool, had a replica made of the trap in the same year and actually caught a mouse in his Gallery with it, even though the trap depicted in the painting was apparently not fully completed.

The background contains a cityscape, probably fictitious, showing the spires of two churches, one of which is now lost, the churches of St. Pierre (left) and Sainte Croix (right) in Liege. (Note: The church is, however, identifiable from surviving documents and contemporary descriptions. See Duchesne-Guillemin (1976), 129)

== Iconography ==
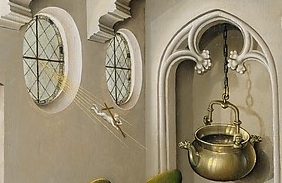
Detail of the center panel

The iconography contains complex religious symbolism, although their extent and exact nature is debated – Meyer Schapiro pioneered the study of the symbolism of the mousetrap, and Erwin Panofsky later extended, or perhaps over-extended, the analysis of symbols to cover many more details of the furniture and fittings. Similar debates exist for many Early Netherlandish paintings, and a number of the details seen for the first time here reappear in later Annunciations by other artists.

The symbolic elements in the central panel mostly relate to the Annunciation, the Mass and the sacrament of the Eucharist. Mary sits on the floor to show her humility. The scroll and book in front of Mary symbolize the Old and the New Testaments, and the roles Mary and the Christ child played in the fulfillment of prophecy. The lilies in the earthenware vase on the table represent Mary's virginity. Other symbols of her purity include the enclosed garden (Hortus conclusus), and the white towel, while the small windows to the right, and the half-closed windows at the rear, serve to emphasise the quiet, virginal life she has lived.

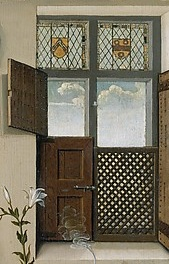
Detail with coat of arms in window, center panel

The lion finials on the bench may have a symbolic role (referring to the Seat of Wisdom, or throne of Solomon) – this feature is often seen in other paintings, religious or secular (like Jan van Eyck's Arnolfini Portrait). The arrangements for washing at the back of the room, which are considered unusual for a domestic interior, may relate to the similar arrangements of a piscina for the officiating priest to wash his hands during Mass. The sixteen sides of the table may allude to the sixteen main Hebrew prophets; the table is usually seen as an altar, and the archangel Gabriel wears the vestments of a deacon. The basin may represent both the purity of Virgin, and the cleansing of the Christian act of baptism.

In the right-hand panel, Saint Joseph, a carpenter, has constructed a mousetrap symbolising Christ's trapping and defeat of the devil, a metaphor used three times by Saint Augustine: "The cross of the Lord was the devil's mousetrap; the bait by which he was caught was the Lord's death." The iconography of the right-hand panel has been studied in detail by Russell. He shows that the object that Joseph is working on is a scandalum or stumbling block, a spiked block that gashes the legs of a punishment victim who walks with it hanging from a cord around his waist. Joseph's joinery instruments are displayed in a consistently unnatural manner, suggesting they were planned to fit a specific agenda; for example, the joinery instruments on the table are arranged to represent the three crosses of Christ and the two thieves.

== Provenance ==
Its early history is obscure. The triptych was owned by the aristocratic Belgian Arenberg and Mérode families from 1820 to 1849 before reaching the art market, and has been in the collection of the Cloisters, New York, since 1956. Until its acquisition, it had been in private collection for many years and thus inaccessible to both scholars and the public. Its purchase was funded by John D. Rockefeller Jr. and was described at the time as a "major event for the history of collecting in the United States".

== Sources ==
- Ainsworth, Maryan. "Intentional Alterations of Early Netherlandish Paintings". Metropolitan Museum Journal. 2005, volume 40, 51–65
- Ainsworth, Maryan. "Religious Painting from 1420 to 1500". Maryan Ainsworth, et al. (eds.), From Van Eyck to Bruegel: Early Netherlandish Painting in the Metropolitan Museum of Art. New York: Metropolitan Museum, 1998. ISBN 0-87099-870-6
- Bauman, Guy. "Early Flemish Portraits 1425–1525". The Metropolitan Museum of Art Bulletin, Volume 43, No. 4, Spring, 1986
- Burroughs, Alan. "Campin and Van der Weyden Again". The Metropolitan Museum of Art Studies, Volume 4, No. 2, March, 1933
- Campbell, Lorne. The Fifteenth Century Netherlandish Paintings. London: National Gallery, 1998. ISBN 978-1-85709-171-7
- Campbell, Lorne. "Robert Campin, the Master of Flémalle and the Master of Mérode". Burlington Magazine, volume 116, no. 860, November 1974
- Duchesne-Guillemin, Jacques. "On the Cityscape of the Mérode Altarpiece". The University of Chicago Press; Metropolitan Museum Journal, volume 11, 1976
- Davies, Martin. "Rogier van der Weyden: An Essay, with a Critical Catalogue of Paintings Assigned to Him and to Robert Campin". London: Phaidon, 1972
- Freeman, Margaret. "The Iconography of the Merode Altarpiece". The Metropolitan Museum of Art Bulletin, volume 16, No. 4, December 1957
- Gottlieb, Carla. "The Symbolism of the Mérode Altarpiece". Oud Holland, volume 85, No. 2, 1970
- Hagen, Rose-Marie; Hagen, Rainer. What Great Paintings Say, Volume 2. Cologne: Taschen, 2003. ISBN 978-3-8228-1372-0
- Harbison, Craig. "The Art of the Northern Renaissance". London: Laurence King Publishing, 1995. ISBN 1-78067-027-3
- Jacobs, Lynn. Opening Doors: The Early Netherlandish Triptych Reinterpreted. University Park, PA: Pennsylvania State University Press, 2002. ISBN 978-0-271-04840-6
- Kleiner, Fred. Gardner's Art through the Ages: The Western Perspective, Volume 2. Boston, MA: Cengage Learning, 2013. ISBN 978-1-133-95480-4
- McNamee, Maurice. Vested Angels: Eucharistic Allusions in Early Netherlandish Paintings. Leuven: Peeters Publishers, 1998. ISBN 978-90-429-0007-3
- Minott, Charles Ilsley. "The Theme of the Mérode Altarpiece". The Art Bulletin, volume 51, No. 3, 1969
- Lane, Barbara The Altar and the Altarpiece, Sacramental Themes in Early Netherlandish Painting. New York: Harper & Row, 1984. ISBN 0-06-430133-8
- Panofsky, Erwin. Early Netherlandish Painting. London: Harper Collins, 1971. ISBN 0-06-430002-1
- Installé, H. "The Merode-triptych. A Mnemonic Evocation of a Merchant Family that fled from Cologne and settled down in Mechelen" (Le triptique Merode: Evocation mnémonique d'une famille de marchands colonais, réfugiée à Malines). In: Handelingen van de Koninklijke Kring voor Oudheidkunde, Letteren en Kunst van Mechelen, No. 1, 1992
- Reuterswärd, Patrik. "New light on Robert Campin". Konsthistorisk tidskrift (Journal of Art History), volume 67, No. 1, 1998
- Rousseau, Theodore. "The Merode Altarpiece". The Metropolitan Museum of Art Bulletin, volume 16, No. 4, 1957
- Schapiro, Meyer. "'Muscipula Diaboli', The Symbolism of the Mérode Altarpiece". The Art Bulletin, volume 27, No. 3, 1945
- Smith, Jeffrey Chipps. The Northern Renaissance. London: Phaidon Press, 2004. ISBN 0-7148-3867-5
- Thürlemann, Felix. "Robert Campin: A Monographic Study with Critical Catalogue". Prestel, 2012. ISBN 978-3-7913-2778-5
- Van Asperen de Boer, J.R.J., et al. "Underdrawing in Paintings of the Rogier Van Der Weyden and Master of Flémalle Groups.” Nederlands Kunsthistorisch Jaarboek (NKJ) / Netherlands Yearbook for History of Art, vol. 41, 1990
- Wolff, Martha; Hand, John Oliver. Early Netherlandish painting. Washington: National Gallery of Art, 1987. ISBN 0-521-34016-0
