= Aggstein Castle =

Ruined castle in Wachau, Austria

Aggstein Castle (Burgruine Aggstein)
- Schönbühel-Aggsbach, Lower Austria, Austria
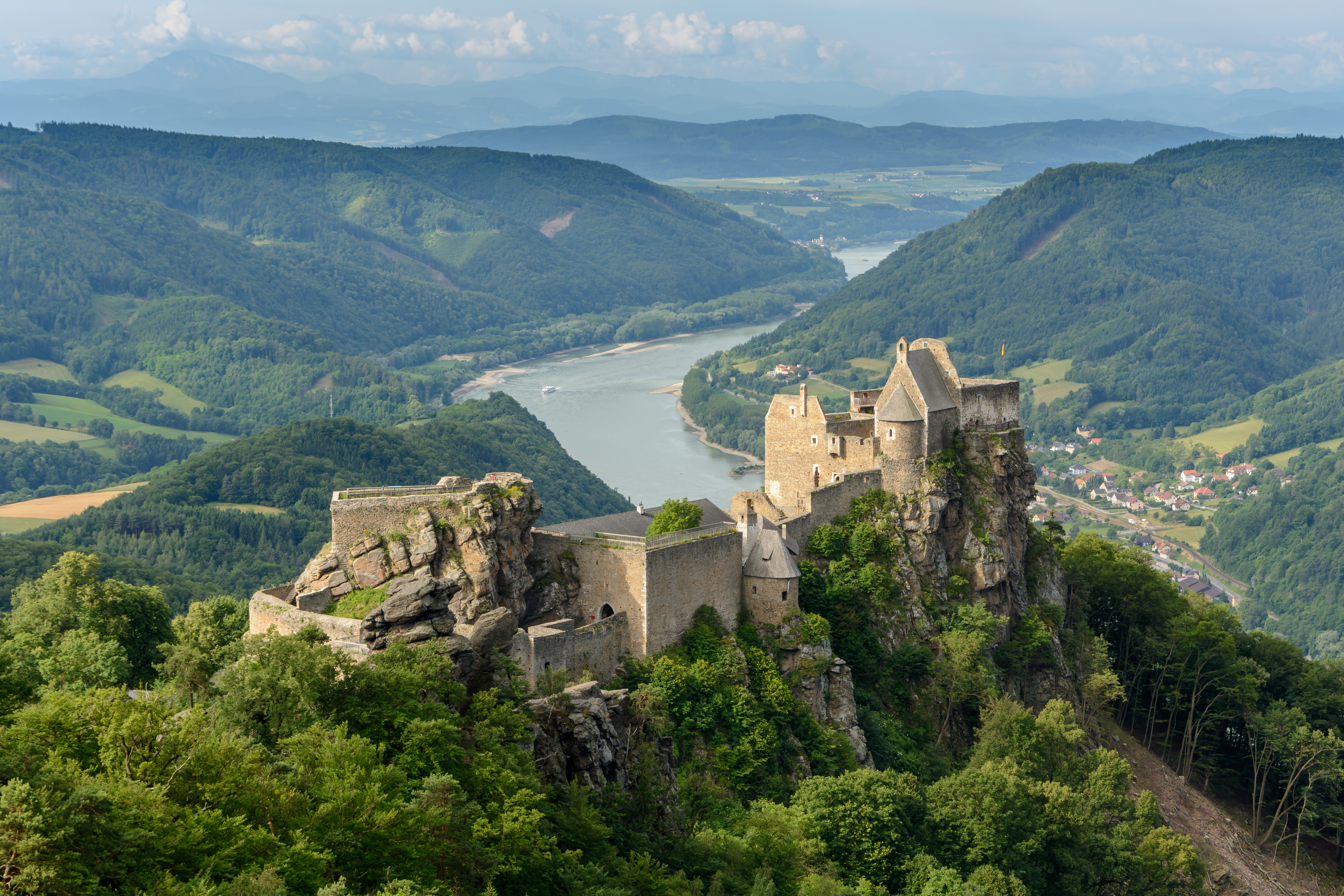

Site information
- Type: Castle
- Condition: In ruins

Location
- Coordinates: 48°18′50″N 15°25′18″E

Site history
- Built: 12th century

Aggstein Castle (German: Burgruine Aggstein, lit. "castle ruins of Aggstein") is a ruined castle on the right bank of the Danube in Wachau, Austria. The castle dates to the 12th century. Aggstein Castle is 480 metres (1,570 ft) above sea level.

== Location ==
The castle ruins are situated at about 300 metres (980 ft) above the right bank of the Danube on an outcrop running from east to west. It is some 150 metres (490 ft) long and has a rock structure at both ends. The ruins are located within the municipality of Schönbühel-Aggsbach in the Melk District of Lower Austria.

== History ==
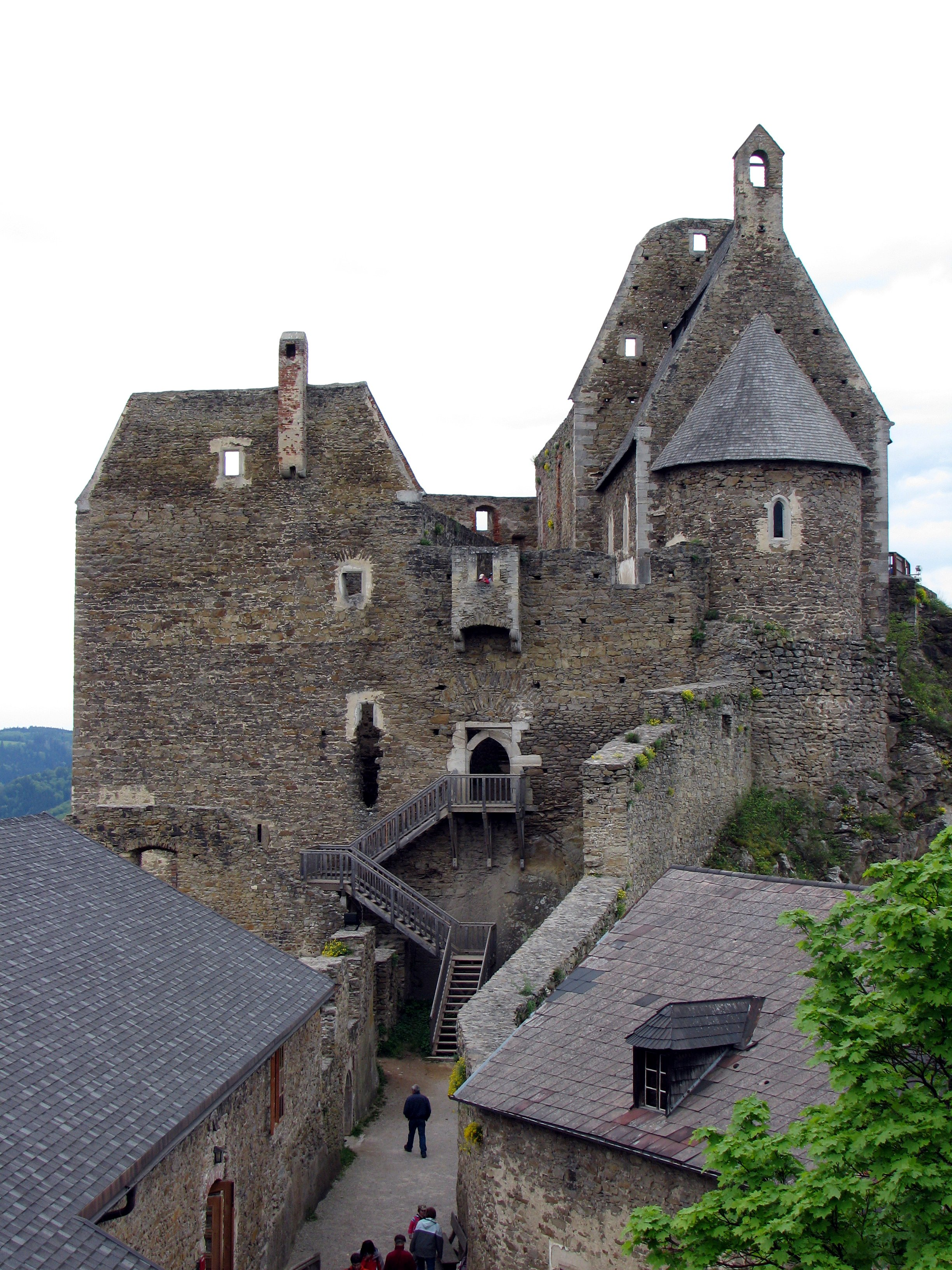
Aggstein Castle

The castle was probably built at the beginning of the 12th century by Manegold III of Acchispach (Aggsbach). In 1181, it came into the possession of the Kuenring family of Aggsbach-Gansbach. It was besieged and conquered in 1230/31 during the uprising led by Hadmar III and his vassals against Duke Frederick II of Austria. In the disputes over the succession of Frederick II, or herrscherlosen Zeit (the "time without a ruler"), the Kuenrings switched sides a few times. Thus Leutold Kuenring outmanoeuvred the Austrian nobility in their revolt against Duke Albert: subsequently, the castle was besieged and conquered in turn in 1295/96. The last Kuenring, Leopold II, held the castle from 1348 to 1355. After that, it fell into disrepair.

In 1429, Duke Albert V assigned the castle to his chamberlain, Jörg (Georg) Scheck von Wald. Albert commissioned him to rebuild the ruined castle to secure the passage of ships on the Danube. In 1438 Scheck von Wald received the right to tolls for ships travelling upriver. In return, he had to maintain the towpaths by which the barges were drawn upstream. In addition he built a toll house on the riverbank that now serves as a forestry house. Over time, he became a robber baron, raiding the ships on the Danube. Hence his nickname, "Schreckenwald", (wordplay on his family name, Scheck von Wald, meaning "Terror Forest"), which is said to have been given to him because of his cruelty towards the population. In 1463 the castle was besieged again by another robber baron, Georg von Stain. He defeated Scheck von Wald and took over the castle as collateral, since the Duke was said to owe him money. In 1476 von Stain was expelled by Ulrich Freiherr von Graveneck who ruled the castle from 1476 to 1477, until he, too, was forced to surrender it.

In 1477, Duke Leopold III acquired the castle and occupied it with tenants and caretakers in order to stop the raids. In 1529, the castle was razed by a group of Turks at the first Turkish siege of Vienna. Again it was rebuilt and equipped with embrasures for artillery pieces.

In 1606 Anna Freiin von Polheim und Parz, the widow of the last tenant, acquired the castle. After her death, the castle was seriously neglected. In 1685, it was transferred to Count Ernst Rüdiger von Starhemberg, along with Schloss Schönbühel. Ludwig Josef Gregor von Starhemberg sold the properties to Count Franz von Beroldingen in 1819. It remained in von Beroldingen's possession until 1930, when the Schönbühel estate, along with the ruins of Aggstein Castle, was sold to Count Oswald von Seilern Aspang.

It is said that Hadmar III had considered the castle impregnable. In fact there is no evidence that the castle was ever stormed directly by force. Only other measures, such as starvation from siege, led to the conquest of the castle.

Today, the Aggstein ruins receive about 55,000 visitors annually, making it one of the most popular tourist attractions in Lower Austria.

== Construction history ==
In the early 12th century, the time of the Kuenrings, the castle was besieged and destroyed at least twice. Only parts of the foundation on the so-called Bürgel (small castle) on the western outcropping, and on Stein, a rock structure on the east side, originate from this time.

In 1429 Jörg Scheck von Wald had it razed and rebuilt. Consequently, from 1429 to 1436 the local people provided the workforce for the rebuilding and enlargement of the castle. Most of the elements that have survived, such as the remnants of the three-storey women's tower, the palace and the gothic chapel, go back to this reconstruction. The famous rose garden was also laid out at this time.

After the Ottomans burned it down, the castle was redesigned as a fort, equipped with embrasures for the artillery.

From 1606, under Anna Freiin von Polheim und Parz, the castle was renovated and a Renaissance-style pulpit was installed in the middle castle. After her death there was no-one to stop its decline, and stones and timber were taken and used to erect a Servite Order convent on nearby Maria Langegg.

Under the Beroldigers the first safety measures to preserve the ruins were carried out. These were completed under Oswald von Seilern.

From 2003 to 2004 the Aggstein Castle Restoration project was set up with funding from the federal state of Lower Austria and the European Agricultural Guidance and Guarantee Fund (EAGGF) totaling €49,630.00. The project was able to repair defective masonry; put sewers, water supply and utilities back into working order; reshape the entrance area and create a new banquet hall.

== Legends ==
=== Hadmar and the Iron Chain ===
Hadmar III von Kuenring is alleged to have captured ships travelling downriver with an iron chain stretched across the Danube. This became too much for Duke Friedrich, who decided to storm the castle. But the castle was known to be able to resist any direct assault, so he resorted to more devious methods.

There was a merchant from Vienna by the name of Rüdiger whom Hadmar had attacked too many times. Friedrich dispatched Rüdiger to Regensburg, where he outfitted a sturdy ship. Loaded with valuable cargo above and with heavily armed soldiers below, the ship traveled back down the Danube. As it passed Schönbühel on its way to Aggstein, a ship that looked to be carrying a rich load, it was hailed and detained. The precious cargo had lured Hadmar himself to the ship. As he boarded the ship, he was overpowered by the soldiers. Just then the ship hove to and cruised towards Vienna, where the Duke was waiting. The leaderless castle was taken immediately. The Duke granted Hadmar his life and liberty on the condition that he returned all the stolen goods and atoned for the injuries he had inflicted.

A few years later in a small village on the Upper Danube while on a pilgrimage to Passau he is said to have died.

=== Jörg Scheck von Wald and the Rosegarden ===
Another legend tells how the cruel Jörg Scheck vom Walde confined his most troublesome prisoners on a tiny outdoor platform. He called it his garden of roses, and here his captives could either starve or jump to their deaths. One of his victims is said to have survived the leap into the treetops below, alerted Duke Albert to the crimes being committed and guided his troops into the castle by a secret route.

== Miscellaneous ==
As part of a series of postage stamps featuring the landscapes of Austria, on 30 November 1973 the Austrian Postal Service issued a 5-Schilling definitive stamp on this motif.

== See also ==
- List of castles in Austria
