= Nativity (Parmigianino) =

Painting by Parmigianino

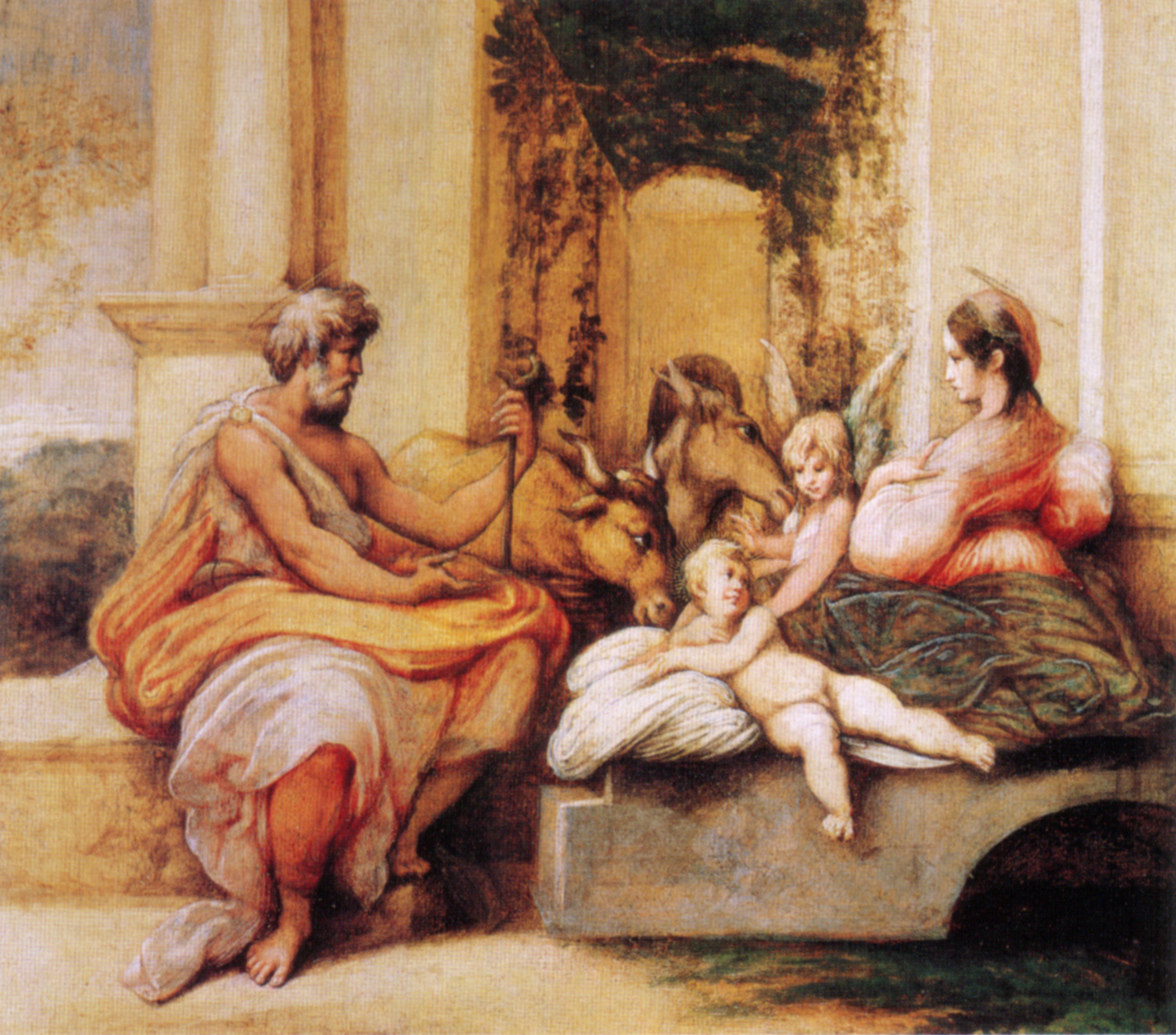
Nativity (c. 1521–1522) by Parmigianino

Nativity or Rest on the Flight into Egypt is a c.1521–1522 oil on panel painting by Parmigianino, now in the Courtauld Gallery in London.

Its attribution as a youthful work by Parmigianino has not always been unanimous, being supported by Sydney Freedberg (1950), Ghidiglia Quintavalle (1963, 1968) and Di Giampaolo (1991) and opposed by Bernard Berenson (1907), Venturi (1926), Fröhlich-Bum (1921) and Copertini (1932, assigning it instead to Bertoia). Recent scholarship has tended to accept it by comparison with other early works such as Adoration of the Shepherds, with the exception of Rossi (1980), who according to Di Giampaolo argued it was a copy.

It passed through several famous collections such as Count Moritz von Fries's collection in Vienna, before being acquired by the English painter Thomas Lawrence in 1830. It was later acquired by the Cook collection in Richmond-upon-Thames, from which it was bought at auction at Christie's on 25 November 1966 by Count Antoine Seilern, who bequeathed it and the same artist's Virgin and Child to its present owner in 1978.
