= Antoine Seilern =

British art historian and collector

Count Antoine Seilern
- Antoine Seilern
- Born: Count Antoine Edward Seilern und Aspang; 17 September 1901; Frensham Place, Farnham, Surrey, England
- Died: 6 July 1978 (aged 76); South Kensington, London, England
- Other names: Antoine Edward Graf Seilern und Aspang; Anton Seilern
- Occupations: art collector and art historian
- Known for: bequest of art works to the Courtauld Gallery

Count Antoine Seilern (17 September 1901 – 6 July 1978) was an Anglo-Austrian art collector and art historian. He was considered, along with Sir Denis Mahon, to be one of a handful of important collectors who was also a respected scholar. The bulk of his collection was bequeathed anonymously to the Courtauld Institute of Art. Known as the "Princes Gate bequest", most of it is on display at the Courtauld Gallery in London.

== Early life ==
Count Antoine Edward Seilern und Aspang was born on 17 September 1901 at Frensham Place, Farnham, in Surrey, England. He was the youngest of the three sons of Count Carl Seilern und Aspang (1866–1940) and the American heiress Antoinette "Nettie" née Woerishoffer (1875–1901). He therefore enjoyed citizenship of both Austria and the United Kingdom. His ancestors had been ennobled after successful involvement with the Pragmatic Sanction of 1713. His father's sister Ida was married to Phillip Hennessy, whose sister Nora was the wife of the Royal Academician Lord Methuen.

He had two older brothers, Count Charles Hugo ("Chappie"), born 1899, and Count Oswald Seilern, born 1900. His mother died five days after he was born. Thereafter the three Seilern boys divided their time between their grandmother, Anna Woerishoffer, in New York City, and their father in London and Vienna, in the company of nannies and governesses (and frequently chaperoned by the Swiss-born American artist Adolfo Müller-Ury), though until America entered the First World War Mrs Woerishoffer spent 1912 to 1916 with her grandsons in Vienna. Anna Woerishoffer's wealth derived mainly from the German-language New York newspaper, the Neue-Yorker Staats-Zeitung, and her late husband's success on Wall Street. Seilern, like his older brothers, grew up with a passion for horse-racing and shooting.

== Further education and business career ==
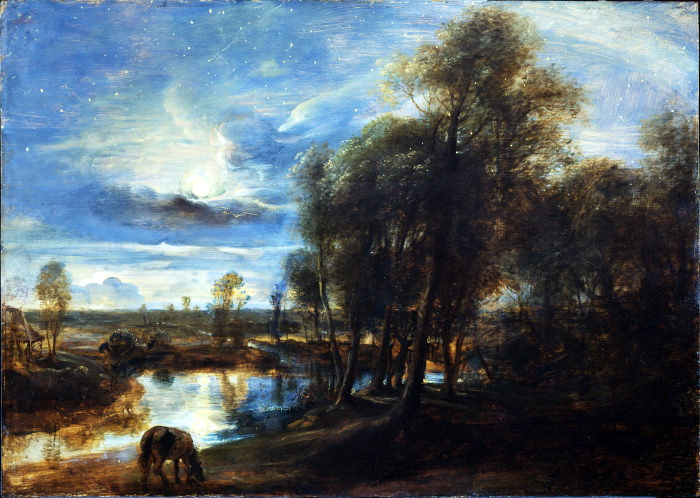
Peter Paul Rubens, Landscape by Moonlight, oil on panel 1635–1640, 64 x 90 cm; now in the Courtauld Gallery

After the First World War Seilern relinquished his Austrian citizenship. However, despite this, he graduated in 1920 from the Realgymnasium in Vienna before attending the Wiener Handelsakademie (1920–1921) and then, at the start of 1922, he enrolled at the Technische Hochschule in order to study for an engineering certificate until 1924. He then worked briefly for a Yugoslavian lumber company, and in Vienna in finance.

== Early collecting and the study of art history ==
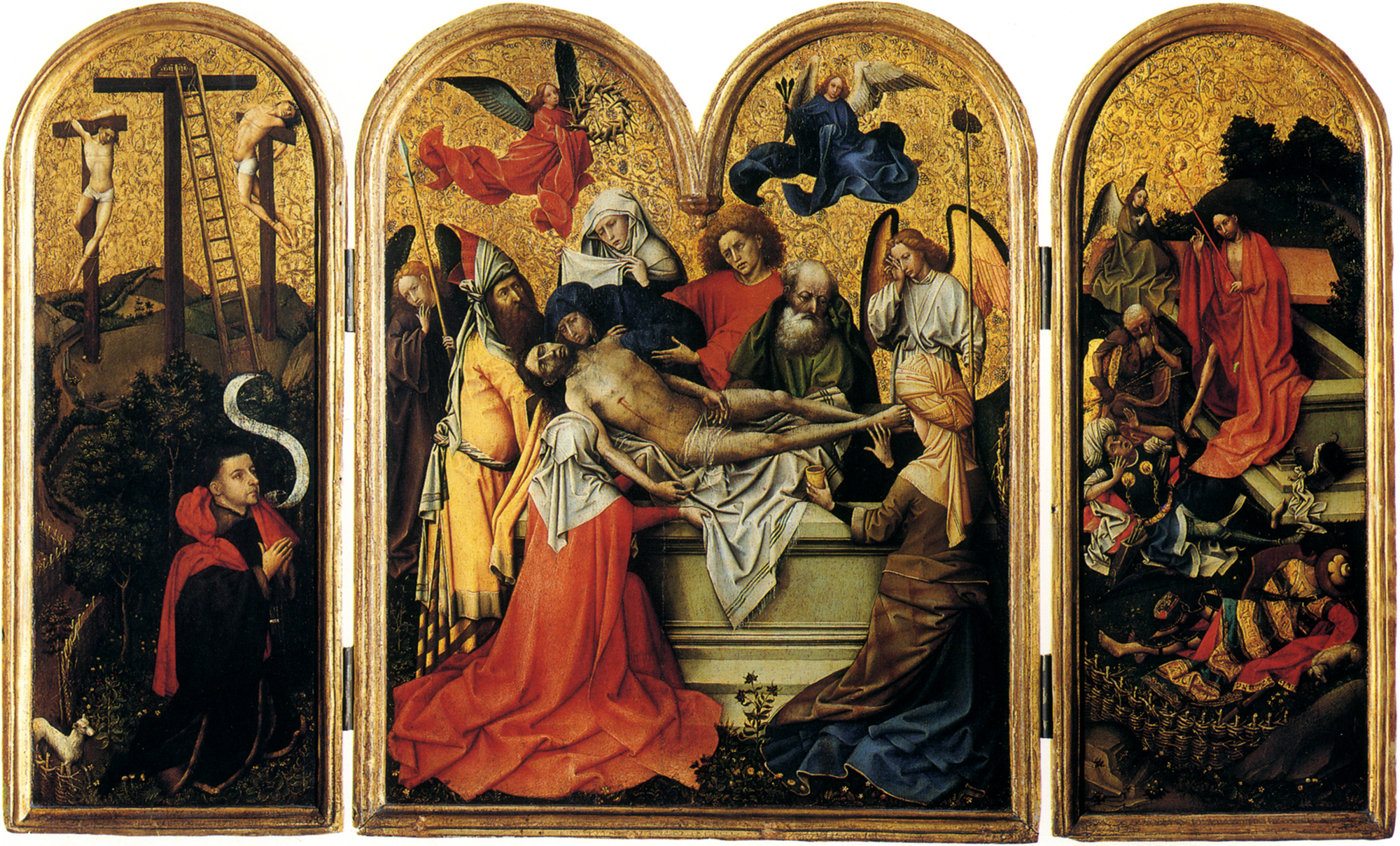
The Seilern Triptych: The Entombment of Christ, paint and gold leaf on panel, painted circa 1425, attributed to Robert Campin (1375/1379-1444), Courtauld Gallery

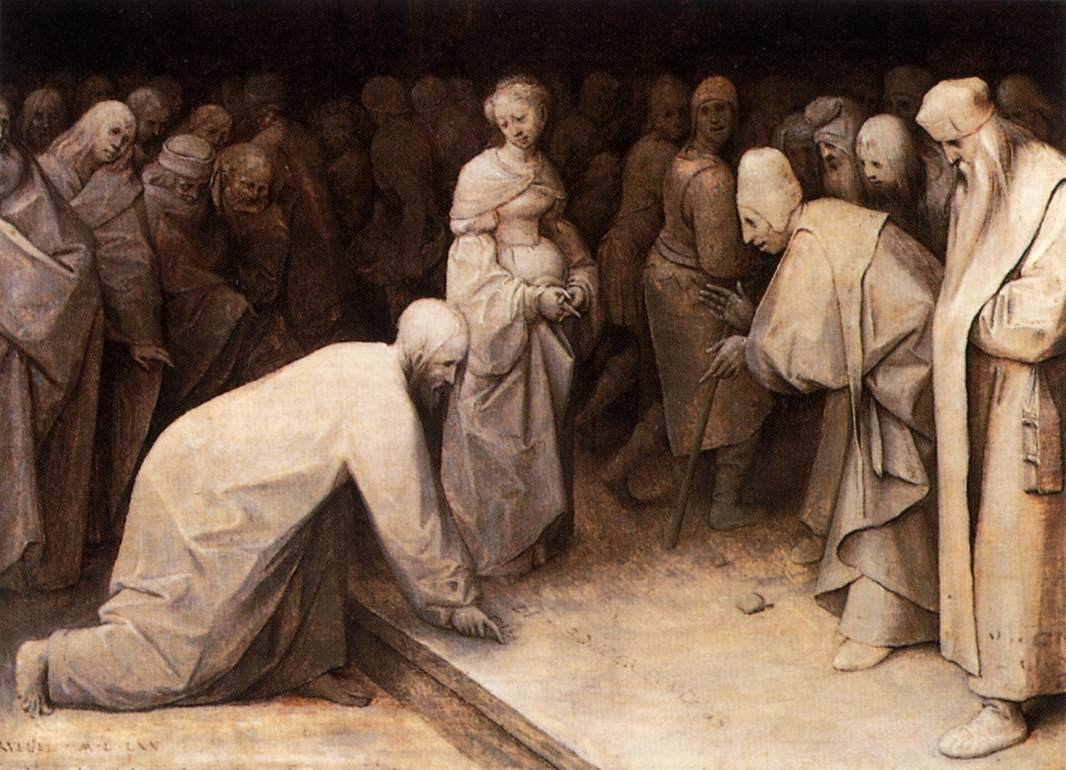
Christ and the Woman Taken in Adultery by Pieter Bruegel, Courtauld

A friend in Vienna, the old Count Karol Lanckoroński (Karl Lanckoronski) a large man of huge charm, who had a fine collection of art at his palace in Vienna, persuaded Seilern he should collect also, and in 1931, after the death of his grandmother, when he received his share of an enormous inheritance, he was able to devote himself to the study of art history and to serious collecting. During the years 1930 to 1933 he travelled widely, particularly in Africa, in search of big-game (as the trophies that could be seen at his house at Princes Gate after the war testified) though his bags were reputedly always packed with art books. He even acquired a pilot's license in Berlin.

However, in 1933, Count Karl Wilczek, another family friend who was also an art historian, recommended Seilern take private lessons with the great Hungarian art historian Johannes Wilde, very soon a mentor who was to become a lifelong friend. Seilern shortly afterwards enrolled at Vienna University to study the history of art with Karl Maria Swoboda, Julius Schlosser and Hans Sedlmayr. Unusually, perhaps, his subsidiary subject at university was Kinderpsychologie (Child Psychology), taught by a lady who was a pupil of Sigmund Freud and who was vouched for by his friend Jan van Gelder. Seilern wrote his doctoral dissertation on the Venetian influences on the ceiling paintings of Sir Peter Paul Rubens (Die venezianischen Voraussetzungen der Deckenmalerei des Peter Paul Rubens) which he completed in 1939. Rubens remained a lifelong passion and he later remarked, "Everything connected with Rubens interests me."

Meanwhile, Seilern had started to collect seriously, and was being advised by Wilde, and Ludwig Burchard, the great Rubens scholar. His collection of Rubens' paintings would soon include Landscape by Moonlight (which was once the possession of Sir Joshua Reynolds), and large numbers of paintings, drawings, copies and modelli also by Rubens, as well as oil sketches by Tiepolo and other masters. Between the wars and whilst studying in Vienna he had kept his art collection in an apartment at Brahmsplatz 1.

== The Second World War ==
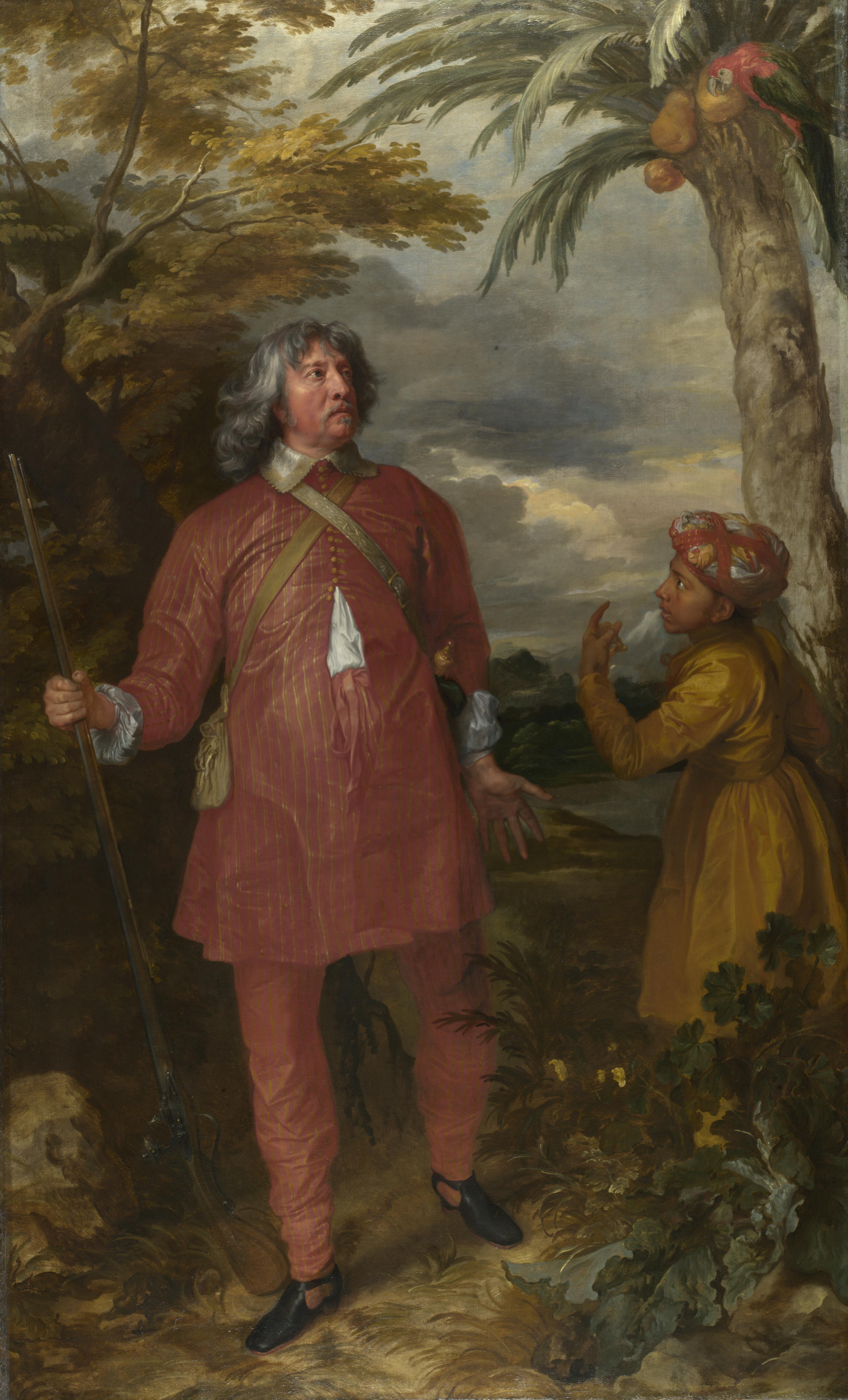
Portrait of William Feilding, 1st Earl of Denbigh (1582–1643), oil on canvas, painted 1633 or 1634 by Anthony van Dyck (1599–1641), donated by Antoine Seilern to the National Gallery in 1945

At the annexation of Austria by Nazi Germany in 1938, and because of his British citizenship (he had apparently hung the Union Jack from his house in Vienna), Seilern decided in 1939 to return to England, bringing with him his already large art collection and his library. Based in England now he was able to provide finance to support to another art historian fleeing from Nazi-occupied Austria, Ludwig Münz, as well as helping Johannes Wilde and his Jewish wife to leave Vienna. The Director of the National Gallery, Sir Kenneth Clark, sponsored Wilde who was reunited with Seilern at Aberystwyth in Wales where his collection was important enough to be hidden with works of art from the National Gallery and Royal Collection. Seilern then enlisted in the ranks of the British Army (though aged thirty-eight), serving in the Royal Artillery, and in 1940 immediately volunteered for the disastrous Russo-Finnish campaign, only escaping from occupied Norway. It was at the end of the Second World War, whilst acting as a German interpreter in the Intelligence Corps, that he appeared at the door of Professor Jan van Gelder in Amsterdam to pick up three oil sketches by Rubens he had bought for Seilern from the Koenig collection in 1940 and had deposited as 'Swedish property' at an Amsterdam bank.

It was when the war was at its height that Seilern purchased The Entombment with Donor and the Resurrection (now called the Seilern Triptych) by the "Master of Flémalle", now usually identified as Robert Campin, one of his finest purchases, which he bought at Christie's as a work attributed to Adriaen Isenbrandt in 1942.

== Collecting and cataloguing art 1945–1978 ==
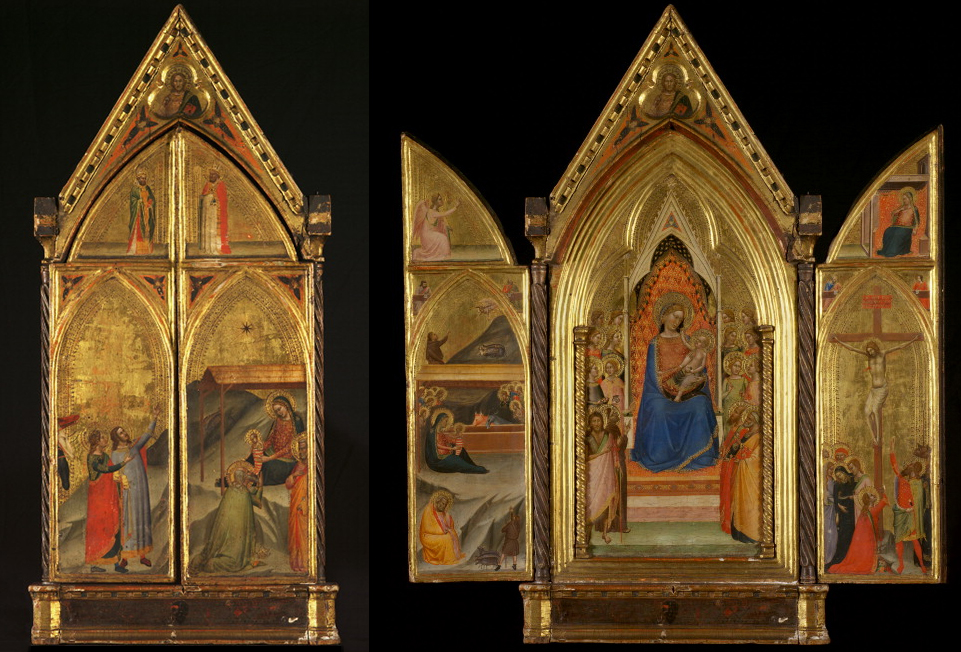
Bernardo Daddi, Triptych: The Virgin and Child Enthroned with Saints, tempera and gold leaf on panel, dated 1338; Courtauld Gallery (shown both closed and open)

Seilern returned to London at the end of the war to live in a great gloomy house he had acquired at 56 Princes Gate, South Kensington, where he rarely opened the blinds and electric light was largely eschewed as he said it distorted colours in pictures. At Princes Gate the ground floor was devoted to his enormous art library, and therefore pictures were hung mainly on the first floor, well-spaced, as in a museum. Other rooms in the house, of course, also held pictures: for example, on the second floor there was a charmingly decorated room called the card-room, which was apparently rarely shown to visitors but in which, eventually, he hung his Tiepolos, and behind this was a private study, hung with a group of Impressionist pictures including a fine late Cézanne.

The war over, he resumed collecting works of art, buying them privately for the most part rather than at auctions, never from a photograph, and never when pressed by a dealer, pictures left 'on approval' frequently being returned. He devoted time to studying them in depth and cataloguing them accurately, though he was also a generous anonymous benefactor of public collections; for example, he lent to exhibitions held at the British Museum (he lent his Michelangelo drawings to the 1975 exhibition there – which he would otherwise not have done except that it was being held in honour of his friend Johannes Wilde), and in 1945 he gave the National Gallery anonymously a very fine full-length portrait of William Feilding, 1st Earl of Denbigh by Sir Anthony van Dyck [NG5633] as well presenting anonymously to the British Museum in 1946 the majority of the important collection of Old Master drawings (some 1250 in number) belonging to Mr. Thomas FitzRoy Fenwick, which had been assembled by Sir Thomas Phillipps, 1st Baronet in the library at Thirlestaine House, Cheltenham, and which had been catalogued by Arthur E. Popham of the museum in 1935 and bought by Seilern en bloc (Seilern retained about two dozen drawings). The proceeds of the sale of the catalogue of his own collection, when it appeared, would be given to the National Art-Collections Fund (now The Art Fund) and the National Trust.

Eventually his collection would come to include masterpieces not just by Rubens (32 paintings – oil sketches and modelli mainly, but also some of the artist's copies of Old Masters like Raphael's portrait of Baldassare Castiglione – and 20 drawings); 14 small copies by David Teniers the Younger after pictures in the collection of Archduke Leopold Wilhelm of Austria during his Governorship of the Spanish Netherlands in 1647–56, commissioned to make a series of prints for the book known as the Theatrum Pictorium first published in 1660; and 12 by Tiepolo (including six oil sketches for paintings for the Monastery Church of Aranjuez, south of Madrid), and pictures by Claude Lorrain, Degas, Van Dyck, Quentin Massys, Lorenzo Lotto, Magnasco, Manet, Francesco de Mura, Palma Vecchio, Parmigianino, Pittoni, Sebastiano Ricci, and Tintoretto. There were also drawings by Giovanni Bellini, Pieter Bruegel (one of the most important collections of his landscape drawings in existence), Hugo van der Goes, Fra Bartolommeo landscape drawings, Michelangelo, Parmigianino, Stefano della Bella, 30 drawings by or attributed to Rembrandt, Van Dyck, Canaletto, Francesco Guardi, Watteau, Degas, Cézanne and Picasso, and drawings and engravings by Albrecht Dürer. Surprisingly perhaps, he commissioned a ceiling painting in triptych form of The Myth of Prometheus for the entrance hall of his home in Princes Gate by his friend Oskar Kokoschka. He also possessed fine Chinese bronzes, Greek vases, Limbourg brothers manuscripts, Holbein manuscripts, and German and Austrian paintings. He is recorded as owning a three-quarter length pastel of his mother by Clemens von Pausinger (1894) as well as a signed and dated bust-length portrait of himself as a boy by Muller-Ury, which was unframed and stored in a cupboard. Starting in 1955 Seilern began the publication of a catalogue in seven volumes assisted by Fritz Grossmann of the most important parts of the collection, though he waited in vain for Wilde to produce catalogue entries on his important Michelangelo drawings.

== Nazi era Provenance issues ==
Of the artworks donated by Seilern, more than one hundred have been listed in the Spoliation Reports for UK Museums because of gaps in the provenance in the years 1933–1945. The heirs of Curt Glaser, a Jewish art collector persecuted by Nazis, requested the return of eight drawing by Lovis Corinth, Pierre Auguste Renoir, Giuseppe Bernardino Bison, Giovanni Battista Crosato, Domenico Fossati and Domenico Piola that Seilern had gifted to the Courtauld in 1978. Seilern had acquired them at the Berlin auction on May 18 and May 19, 1933. The U.K. Spoiliation Advisory panel decided against the heirs in 2009.

== Death ==
Seilern died in hospital in London in the early hours of 6 July 1978; he was 76. He was buried on 13 July in the churchyard in Frensham, Surrey. His family later had the body exhumed and had it re-interred in the family vault at Schloss Schönbühel, approximately 80 km west of Vienna.

== Bequest to the Courtauld Gallery ==
Whilst he lived he was persuaded by Johannes Wilde, who had quickly been appointed by Anthony Blunt deputy director of The Courtauld Institute of Art, London, to leave the majority of the paintings and drawings in his collections to the Courtauld Institute Galleries, which already had bequests given by Samuel Courtauld, Viscount Lee of Fareham, Roger Fry, Mark Gambier-Parry and other benefactors. This bequest was made after his death with the condition that it be made anonymously, and be called The Princes Gate Collection. His friend Michael Kitson, another art historian, was given the responsibility under his will of ensuring that the collection was moved to the Courtauld and appropriately displayed. This included his Michelangelo drawings, his Rubens collection, his Tiepolos, Parmigianino's Virgin and Child and Rest on the Flight into Egypt, the Kokoschka ceiling and Bernardo Daddi's masterpiece Virgin and Child with Saints from 1338, which Seilern had purchased in 1956, as well as modern works by Pissarro, Edgar Degas, Pierre-Auguste Renoir and others, and two pictures by Daubigny and Narcisse Virgilio Díaz he had retained from his grandmother's collection in New York. The Courtauld also received his papers relating to the collection.

Not everything at Princes Gate was bequeathed to the Courtauld as the Kunsthistorisches Museum in Vienna was bequeathed two paintings: a copy by Van Dyck of a Titian called 'Madonna and Child with St Dorothy' and a painting by Domenico Fetti called 'The Return of the Prodigal Son' and Seilern's nephews and nieces received substantial bequests of groups of art works in the collection, like the Dürer engravings, Greek vases, German and Austrian paintings not in the published catalogue (that hung principally on the bedroom floor at Princes Gate), and the pictures at the farm in Buckinghamshire.

== Personal life and character ==
Seilern never married, was extremely reserved, and his private life is undocumented although he had many women friends, and was evidently fond of his brother Charles's four children, his cousin Paul Methuen (whose pictures he bought occasionally, apparently never keeping them but giving them away as presents), and enjoyed long friendships with scholars like Wilde, Ludwig Burchard, Anthony Blunt, Michael Kitson, and unusually, as he was perforce also a dealer, James Byam Shaw.

After the war he also acquired Hog Lane Farm close to Chesham, Buckinghamshire, where he bred pigs (Courtauld Institute students of the 1950s sometimes alleged to have seen him outside 20 Portman Square in a sports car with a pet pig beside him) and grew orchids and fruit which he enjoyed giving to his friends. For convenience he often rode a moped when in London.

He was a large man with quite a booming voice, and according to James Byam Shaw possessed something of a dual character, being business-like and intellectual with his male friends, but with women of all ages had all the charm and manners of an aristocrat from the former Austro-Hungarian Empire.

== Portraits ==
He was painted at least twice as a boy by Adolfo Müller-Ury, who was a close friend of his mother and father and who had acted as an usher at their wedding in New York in February 1898, and who, along with the other ushers, had been given a gold cigarette box by 'Carlo' Seilern by way of thanks. The first portrait was in a group portrait with his two brothers which was certainly painted in London in the summer of 1906 and was exhibited at Knoedler in New York in December that year. The New York Herald, 5 December 1906, called the group 'graceful' and on 8 December 1906 commented that '...The boys are about 4, 6, and 7 years in age, and they have been painted out of doors.' The second was in late 1906, a full-length dressed in ermine with a rabbit on a string (first exhibited in January 1907 at Knoedler and in February 1908 at the Corcoran Gallery of Art in Washington DC). Both are unlocated. A head and shoulders of Antoine peeping out from behind a red curtain and dated 1909 was in his possession at Princes Gate at his death in 1978 and is now in a private collection in Austria; what appears to be a reduced version of the full-length portrait survives in a private collection in Lucerne, Switzerland; the group portrait is only known through photographs.

Muller-Ury also painted portraits [all lost] of his mother in 1898, two of his aunt Carola Woerishoffer aged 13 in 1898 and posthumously as an adult (like her sister she died young, but in a car crash), and his much beloved grandmother, Mrs Charles Woerishoffer, seated in a lakeland, around 1912.

== Publications ==
Between 1955 and 1971 Antoine Seilern published an illustrated catalogue of his collection in seven parts; he was assisted by Fritz Grossmann. He dedicated the catalogue to his grandmother, Mrs Charles Woerishoffer. The catalogue consists of:

- Flemish Paintings & Drawings at 56 Princes Gate, London SW7, 2 volumes. London: Shenval Press, 1955
- Italian Paintings & Drawings at 56 Princes Gate, London SW7, 2 volumes. London: Shenval Press, 1959
- Paintings and Drawings of Continental Schools Other than Flemish and Italian at 56 Princes Gate, London SW7, 2 volumes. London: Shenval Press, 1961
- Flemish Paintings & Drawings at 56 Princes Gate, London SW7: Addenda. London: Shenval Press, 1969
- Italian Paintings & Drawings at 56 Princes Gate, London SW7: Addenda, 2 volumes. London: Shenval Press, 1969
- Recent Acquisitions at 56 Princes Gate, London SW7, 2 volumes. London: Shenval Press, 1971
- Corrigenda & addenda to the catalogue of Paintings & Drawings at 56 Princes Gate, London SW7. London: Shenval Press, 1971

== Bibliography ==
- 'Count Seilern's Flemish Paintings and Drawings' in The Burlington Magazine (December 1955), pp. 396–398
- Michael Levey, 'Count Seilern's Italian Pictures and Drawings' in The Burlington Magazine (March 1960) pp. 122–3
- Helen Braham, 'Introduction' to The Princes Gate Collection, Courtauld Institute Galleries, London, 1981, pp. vii-xv
- Dennis Farr, 'Seilern und Aspang, Count Antoine Edward (1901–1978)' in The Oxford Dictionary of American Biography
- James Byam Shaw, 'Count Antoine Seilern (1901–78)' (obituary) in The Burlington Magazine (November 1978), pp. 760–2
- Anthony Blunt, 'Antoine Seilern: Connoisseur in the Grand Tradition' in Apollo (January 1979), pp. 10–23.
- Helen Braham,'My Little Collection' in The Antique Collector (January 1991), pp. 35–41
- Stephen Conrad, 'Re-introducing Adolfo Müller-Ury 1862–1947: The artist, two dealers, four counts and the Kaiser: A hitherto unknown episode in international art history' in The British Art Journal, Volume 4, No. 2, Summer 2003, pp. 57–65.
- Ernst Vegelin van Claerbergen, 'Everything connected with Rubens interests me': collecting Rubens' oil sketches: the case of Count Antoine Seilern' in Natalya Gritsay, Alexey Larionov, Stephanie-Suzanne Durante and Ernst Vegelin van Claerbergen, Rubens: A Touch of Brilliance (London, 2003)
- Brian Sewell, Outsider II – Always Almost: Never Quite, An Autobiography (London, 2012), pp. 128–133

Auction catalogues:

- 'Early Chinese Ceramics, Archaic Bronzes, Paintings and Works of Art: the Property of the Estate of the Late Count Antoine Seilern, sold by Order of Beneficiaries.' Christie's, London, 1982
- 'Albrecht Dürer: Prints from the Collection of the late Count Antoine Seilern.' Christie's, London, 1998
- 'The Count Oswald Seilern Collection: from the library of the late Count Oswald Seilern; with two additions from the collection of the late Count Antoine Seilern.' Christie's, London, 2003
