= Fritz Grossmann =

Austrian-British art historian (1902–1984)

Fritz Grossmann (26 June 1902 – 16 November 1984) was an Austrian-British art historian.

== Biography ==
Fritz Grossmann was born 26 June 1902 in Stanislau, then Galicia in the Austro-Hungarian Empire, now Ivano-Frankivsk in Ukraine. He was the son of a surgeon in the Austro-Hungarian Army. He studied art history at the University of Vienna under Josef Strzygowski. He also attended lectures by Julius von Schlosser, Hans Tietze, Swoboda and Heinrich Gluck. He graduated in 1927 and completed his doctorate in 1932. His thesis was a study of the High Altar in the Benedictine Scottish Monastery in Vienna Die Passions- und Marienlebenfolge im Wiener Schottenstift und ihre Stellungin der Wiener Malerei der Spätgotik. Through his close friendship with other members of the Vienna School of Art History, most notably Fritz Novotny and Hans Tietze, he became closely connected with the promotion of the work of contemporary artists in Vienna. He was close friends with artists and sculptors such as Georg Erhlich, Bettina Erhlich, Gerhart Frankl, Fritz Wotruba, Georg Merkel, Theodore Fried, Lisel Salzer and Lois Pregartbauer. These were mainly artists who were part of the Hagenbund and had connections with the Zinkenbacher Malerkolonie on the Wolfgangsee. He was employed as a lecturer in the Volkhochschule, taking part in their Art History Urania promotion programme and he also gave regular broadcasts on art history on Radio Vienna. From 1930 onwards he was the Austrian Editor of the Czech magazine for contemporary art Forum and also a contributor to Belvedere.

=== Move to London ===
In December 1938, as a result of the Anschluss, he left Vienna for London to work as a researcher for Ludwig Burchard on the Corpus Rubenianum. At this time he developed his interests in Netherlandish Art and in particular the work of Holbein and Bruegel. In 1945 he helped Anthony Blunt to catalogue the German and Netherlandish Paintings in the Royal Collection for the Exhibition The King's Pictures, which was held at the Royal Academy of Arts in 1946-7. He was also a close friend and advisor to Antoine Seilern, the Art Collector who amassed the notable Princess Gate Collection of paintings which was given to the Courtauld Gallery in 1978. In 1955 his study on Pieter Bruegel the Elder was published, which was rapidly accepted as the standard work on the artist and the following year he edited a revised translation of Max Friedländer's From Van Eyck to Bruegel for the Phaidon Press.

=== Manchester and Seattle ===
In 1960, he moved to the Manchester City Art Gallery where he became Deputy Director. In this period he mounted several notable exhibitions particularly on the work of Wenceslas Hollar(1961) and on Mannerist art (1965). He retired in 1966 and shortly afterwards became Visiting Professor of Art History at the University of Washington in Seattle from which he finally retired in 1972. He lived for the remainder of his life in Dulwich, London He died on 16 November 1984 in Croydon, London.

His personal art historical archive of research and documentation relating to Pieter Bruegel the Elder was in 1985 donated to the Rubenianum in Antwerp, Belgium following his death.

In 2013 the Zinkenbacher Malerkolonie Museum in St. Gilgen held an exhibition of the paintings collected by Fritz Grossmann which were associated with the Marlerkolonie and artists of the Hagenbund.

== Selected works ==
- (1931), "Zur Wiener Kubin-Ausstellung". In: Belvedere. 10.
- (1932) Malende Dichter und dichtende Maler. Wien: Gesellschaft zur Förderung moderner Kunst Hagenbund. (Catalogue for an exhibition held in Vienna).
- (1934) "Der Marler Gerhart Frankl". In: Forum Bd. II
- (1938) Die Tafelmalerei des 14. und 15. Jahrhunderts in Österreich, Vienna
- (1950) "Holbein, Torrigiano and some portraits of Dean Colet: A study of Holbein's work in relation to sculpture". In: Journal of the Warburg and Courtauld Institutes. 13.
- (1951) "Holbein Studies—I". In: Burlington Magazine 93 (Feb. 1951)
- (1951) "Holbein Studies—II". In: Burlington Magazine 93 (April 1951)
- (1951) "Bruegel's 'Woman Taken in Adultery' and Other Grisailles". In: Burlington Magazine 94.
- (1955) Bruegel: The Paintings, Complete Edition. Phaidon London.
- (1957) "Flemish Paintings at Bruges." In: Burlington Magazine 99, January 1957.
- (1961) "Breughels Verhältnis zu Raffael und zur Raffael-Nachfolge". In: Festschrift Kurt Badt zum 70. Geburtstage.
- (1961) "A Religious Allegory by Hans Holbein the Younger". In: Burlington Magazine 103 (1961) 49
- (1963). Between Renaissance and Baroque: European Art: 1520–1600. Manchester City Art Gallery.
- (1973) "Notes on sources of Bruegel’s Art". In: Album Amicorum J G Van Gelder,
- (1973) "Some Observations on G.de La Tour and the Netherlandish Tradition". In: Burlington Magazine, Sept. 1973, pp. 576‐33. 1–494.

== Biographical Literature ==
- E. H. Gombrich, "Fritz Grossmann" (obituary). In: Burlington Magazine, 127, June 1985.
- Marie Theres Arnbom et al., Bilder aus den Koffer: Die Sammlung Fritz Grossmann und die Wiederentdeckung von Theodor Fried. Austellung Museum Zinkenbacher, 13 Juli bis 13 Oktober 2013. St. Gilgen 2013.
- Hilde Cuvelier, "Empathy and deep understanding, Fritz Grossmann (1902–84) and his Bruegel Archive at the Rubinianum", in Nijkamp L. et al. (eds) Picturing Ludwig Burchard 1886–1990. A Rubens Scholar in Art-Historical Perspective. Harvey Miller/Brepols, London/Turnhout 2015, pp. 133–150.
