= Schloss Schönbühel =

Castle in Lower Austria

- Schönbühel-Aggsbach, Melk, Lower Austria
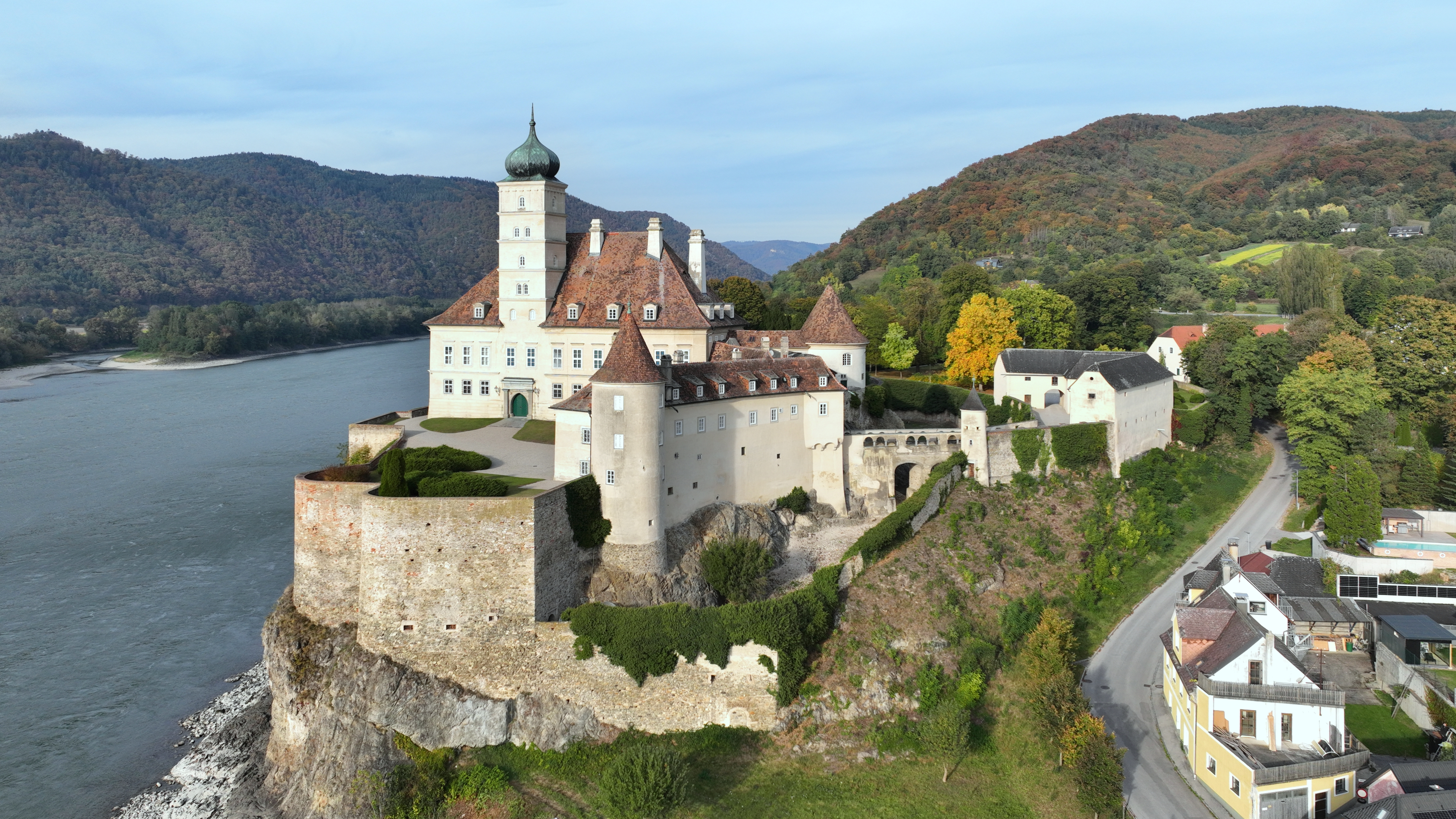

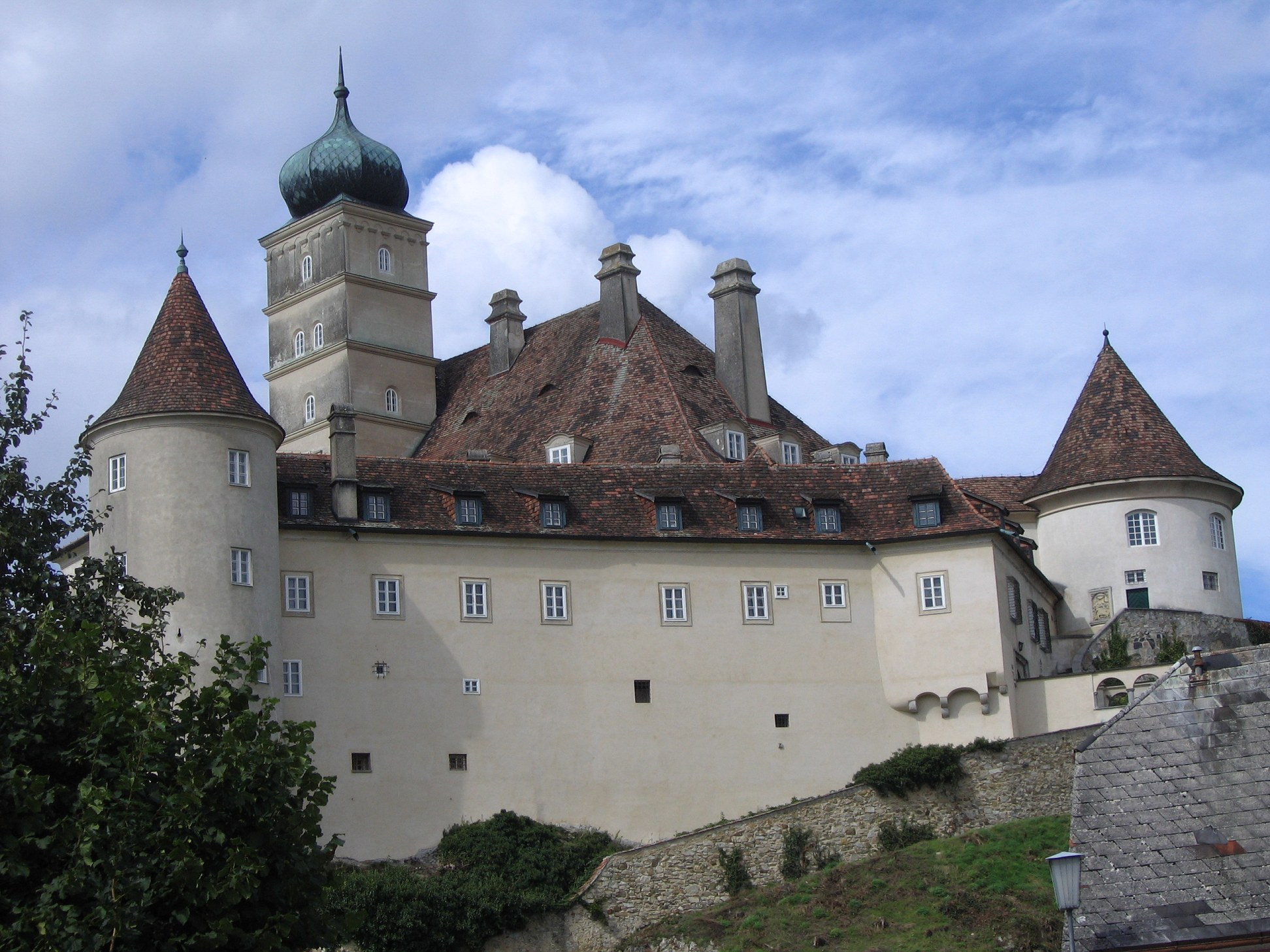

Site information
- Type: castle

Location
- Coordinates: 48.2582°N 15.3736°E

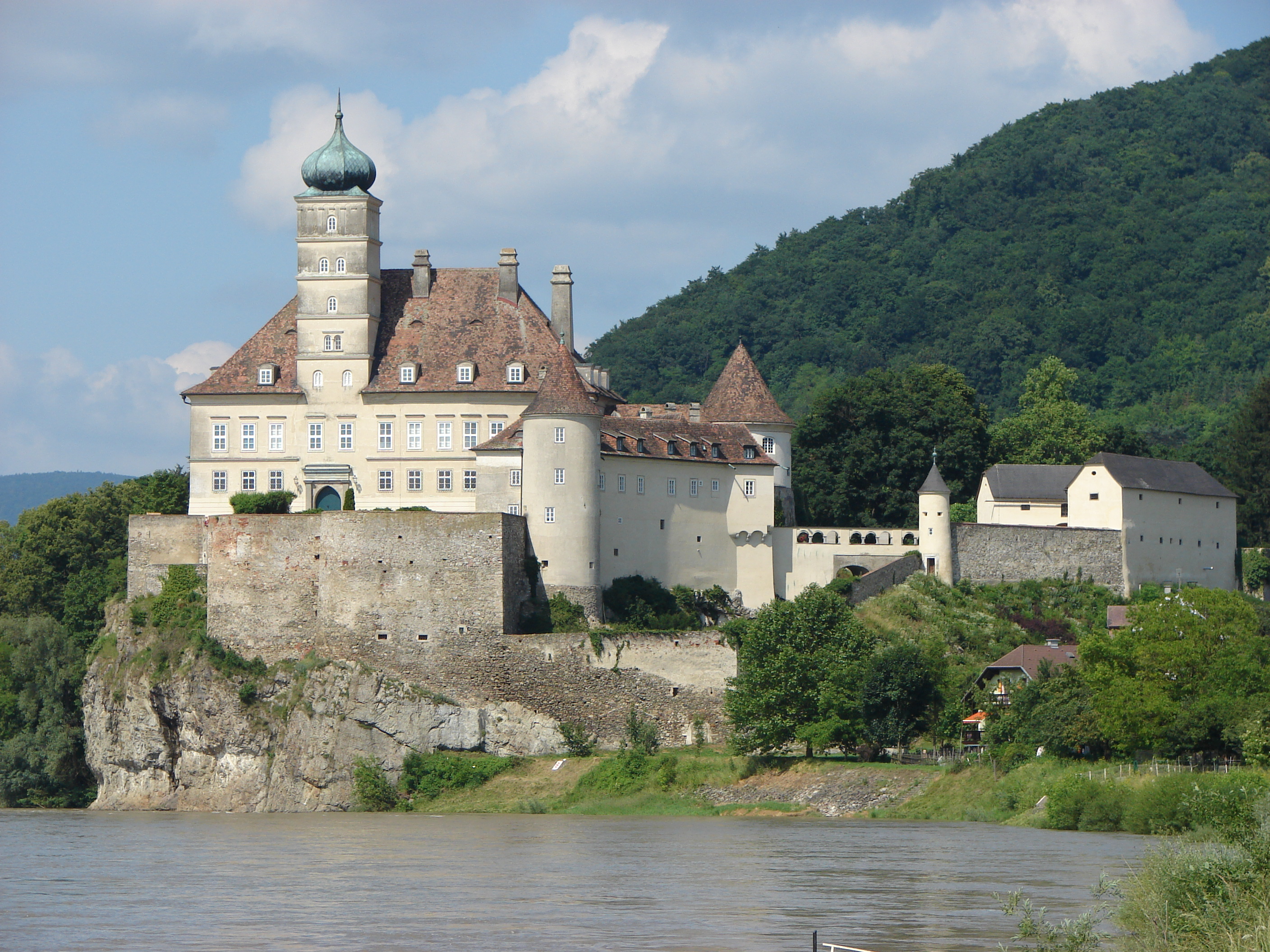
The castle seen from the Danube

Schloss Schönbühel is a castle in the Lower Austrian town of Schönbühel-Aggsbach, below Melk on the right bank of the Danube. The origins of the castle date from the early twelfth century.

== History ==
The castle is built on rock approximately 40 metres (130 ft) above the level of the river Danube. A Roman fortress may have stood there before. The castle was begun in the early twelfth century by Marchwardus de Schoenbuchele as a defensive fortress. When his descendant Ulrich von Schonpihel died at the beginning of the fourteenth century, the family was extinguished. The castle was briefly owned by Conrad von Eisenbeutel, and then by the Abbey of Melk. In 1396 it was sold to the brothers Caspar and Gundaker von Starhemberg. It remained in the Starhemberg family for more than 400 years, but fell into disrepair.

In 1819 Prince Ludwig Josef von Starhemberg sold it, together with the castle of Aggstein, to Count Franz von Beroldingen, who had it renovated and partially rebuilt, so that by 1821 it was again habitable.

In 1930 the Schönbühel estate was sold to Count Oswald von Seilern und Aspang.
