= Theodore Fried =

Hungarian artist

Theodore Fried (May 19, 1902 -1980 - known to his friends as Tivadar Fried) was a Hungarian artist, who worked in Vienna, Paris and New York.

== Early life (Budapest-Vienna) ==
Fried was born in Budapest (or possibly Szeged) in 1902. His father – a watchmaker and jeweller – died when he was nine years old. In 1920 he entered the Budapest Academy of Fine Arts and studied under Gyula Rudnay for four years. His surviving early work includes charcoal drawings of scenes of life which reflect the hardship and poverty of the period after the First World War. To broaden his horizons he moved to Vienna in June 1924 taking with him seven oil paintings and sixty drawings. He was given a one-man exhibition at the Galerie Hugo Heller. This gallery was run by the Heller family. Hugo Heller, who had died the previous year, had been a bookseller and a central figure in Viennese cultural life, who was particularly noted for promoting the writings of Sigmund Freud. It was through the Galerie that he came to meet the younger generation of Austrian artists, who were connected with the Hagenbund and art critics and art historians such as Fritz Grossmann and Fritz Novotny. It was also through the Heller family connection that he is likely have met his first wife, Anna Politzer, the daughter of a Viennese goldsmith. He had a further exhibition at Galerie Hugo Heller in early 1925, but in June 1925 moved to Paris.

== Paris and Toulouse (1924–1941/1942) ==
On his move to Paris he established himself as a member of the École de Paris. He set up a studio in Montmartre and through his acquaintance with the Belgian writer and avant garde painter, Ferdinand Berckelaers Michael Seuphor he was introduced to the Paris art scene. Seuphor was Hungarian speaking and this led to Fried meeting the Hungarian photographer André Kertész, with whom he established a lifelong friendship. Together with Kertész, Fried spent much of his time at Le Dôme Café, a popular meeting place for the many artists who had come to Paris at this time. Later that year Fried exhibited his first painting at the Salon d'Automne amongst the foreign grouping beaux-arts de la France d'outre-mer which at that time included Picasso and Chagall. In 1926 he married Anna Politzer, who had just completed her Doctorate at Jena University.

During these years Fried struggled to make a living. He appears to have undertaken dress design for a Paris Fashion house. Through his friendship with a sculptor who lived below him who ran a puppet theatre, he was employed as puppeteer, and this was recorded by a photograph taken by Kertész in 1930. He had when young ambitions to become a musician, and while in Paris he played the violin in a cinema orchestra. From 1931 onwards he painted White Russian refugee Cossack singers. Orchestras and musicians become an increasingly important theme in his work.

Fried kept up his connection with Viennese art scene and appears to have visited Vienna on a regular basis in the inter-War years. In 1927 he contributed to the exhibition Das Werden eines Kunstwerkes at the Osterreichisches Museum fur Kunst und Industrie. Other contemporary Austrian artists who exhibited were Georg Ehrlich, Ferenczy, Hannak, Jungnickel, Kokoschka, Laske and Georg Merkel. The exhibition concentrated on studies which the artists had used to create a particular artwork. Fried submitted the studies for his Blinder Spielzeugmacher (Blind Toymaker). This painting was later acquired by the Kunstverein in Jena, and the painting was later to be included in Hitler's Degenerate Art Exhibitions or entartete Kunst in 1937/8. Also in 1930 he exhibited in Vienna in the exhibition organised by Hans Tietz Die Kunst in unsure Zeit, alongside artists such as Picasso, Nolde, Kokoschka, Franz Marc, Kandinsky and Munch. From 1929-31 he was a guest exhibitor at the Hagenbund exhibitions in Vienna and from 1932-38 he was a full member of the Hagenbund. Later in 1935 a major exhibition of his art together with work of the Austrian artist Frieda Salvendy, was staged in Prague. In 1930 the Fried's only child Christopher was born. Studies of children and his son in particular, now become a recurring theme in his paintings and drawings. During the 1930s became a more established figure on the Paris art scene and was given a major commission to decorate a pavilion at the 1937 Paris World Exhibition.

=== Escape from France and arrival in New York ===
With the increasing threat of war in Europe, as both Fried and his wife were of Jewish ancestry, they applied to emigrate to the USA. His wife had no problem with her visa because she was Austrian, and their son, born in Paris, met the criteria because he was a French citizen. Fried stayed behind to finish illustrations for a book, and several months later, when he applied for his visa, it was not granted because the quota for Hungarian emigrants was filled. With the German invasion and the establishment of the French Vichy Government, Fried together with the sculptor Jacques Lipchitz bought a cheap car and fled to Toulouse, where Fried worked as a portrait photographer and forger of passports and documents for those involved in the Resistance. At this time a large number artists and other Jewish intellectuals had gathered in this area. Through the efforts of the American journalist Varian Fry and the American vice-consul at Marseilles [Hiram Bingham], it was possible for some of them to gain visas to USA. In the case of Fried it appears this was arranged by the Quaker American Friends Service Committee. It is not clear how Fried escaped from France, but it was probably through Spain and the date of his escape is uncertain. What appears to be certain is that he got to Casablanca and was aboard the "Serpa Pinta" which was bound for New York. One account gives the date May 1942 when he was in Casablanca and June for his arrival in New York. Another account states that he travelled with the artist Marcel Duchamp and the Polish harpsichordist Wanda Landowska and that he arrived in New York, before the artist Marc Chagall, whom he was to meet at the dock, and helped him to settle into the New York artistic community. While it seems certain that he knew Chagall in New York, Chagall had arrived in New York in June 1941, while Wanda Landowska arrived in December 1941.

== Later life ==
After arriving at New York, Fried and his wife Anne drifted apart and their marriage broke up. Anne Fried became Director of the James Weldon Johnson Community, New York, but, in 1960, their son Christopher Risto Fried moved to Finland and became Professor of Psychology at the University of Jyväskylä. Anne Fried moved to Finland in 1969, having learnt Finish, and she became a leading Finnish novelist and writer. She died in 1999 and Risto Fried died in 2004. Fried became a very active member of the artists community in Greenwich village, many of whom were emigres from central Europe, and in particular he re-established his friendship with Kertész, who was now gaining widespread recognition as a photographer.

Meanwhile, in 1947 Fried married Maria Englehardt, who was actively committed to social work, and they were to establish an art school within the Hudson Guild, a charitable organisation in West 25 Street. It was here that he was involved in organizing exhibitions. Fried specialized in teaching etching and the techniques of woodcuts and amongst his students was the sculptor Jacques Lipchitz, with whom he had escaped from Paris to Toulouse in 1940. In 1969 his studio was largely destroyed by a serious fire, but shortly afterwards he was able to move to the newly created artists studios in the Westbeth Graphics Workshops which are in the nearby Bethune Street. This was a commune of artists and Fried continued teaching and was active in organizing exhibitions connected with the Westbeth Graphics Workshops. He was also particularly successful as a portrait painter, while at the same producing etchings, linocuts and woodcuts, which in some cases were used as book illustrations.These included the work of the poet Michael Blumenthal, whose Sympathetic Magic, published in 1980 was illustrated by Fried. In 1960 Fried was able to retrieve some 59 of the paintings he had completed before the War which he had left stored in Paris, but it was not until the year before his death in 1979, that he was able to regain possession of a further group of paintings that had been stored in Toulouse.

In 1972 the Frieds moved to the Old Parsonage in Otis in Berkshire County, Massachusetts, where they spent the summer months, although he continued to work and live in Greenwich village where he died of a heart attack in July 1980. Following his death and to commemorate his close friendship with Kertész the H V Allinson Gallery in New York mounted an exhibition Theodore Fried & André Kertész: An Enduring Friendship, which was based largely on the paintings recovered from Toulouse. In the late 1980s the Theodore Fried Trust was established for the Fried's artwork and to commemorate the anniversary of his birth in 2002, an exhibition was held at the Madelyn Jordon Fine Art Gallery, Scarsdale, NY, Theodore Fried – A Centennial Retrospective.

Following this, Fried's archive and paintings belonging to the trust were deposited with the Sherwin Miller Museum of Jewish Art in Tulsa, Oklahoma, which mounted an exhibition of his works Theodore Fried: Survival of a Jewish Artist in 2006. In 2014, the museum opened a career retrospective, Theodore Fried: Pivotal Moments in 20th-Century Art. In Austria In 2013 the Zinkenbacher Malerkolonie Museum in St Gilgen held an exhibition of the paintings collected by Fritz Grossmann which were associated with the Marlerkolonie and artists of the Hagenbund. This exhibition included a wide selection of Fried's early paintings.

== Exhibitions ==
- 1924 &1925 Galerie Hugo Heller, Vienna
- 1927 Das Werden eines Kunstwerkes Gesellschaft zur Forderung Moderner Kunst in Wien,
- 1929 Kunsthaus Schaller, Stuttgart
- 1930 Die Kunst in unserer Zeit Kunstlerhaus Vienna
- 1935 Ausstellung Frida Salvendy und Theodor Fried. Kunstverein für Bohmen
- 1935 Salon des Tuileries
- 1938 Peintures et Dessins (1928-1935) de Th. Fried. Jeunes Peintres Association des Peintres et Sculpteurs de la Maison de la Culture Paris
- 1960 Group Exhibition Pietrantonio Galleries, East Street, New York
- 1973 Paintings of Theodore Fried, The Berkshire Museum, Pittsfield, Massachusetts
- 1979 Variations on two themes: Kites and Musicians 1926-Present by Theo Fried. Pratt Gallery,
- 1980 Theo Fried, Haim Mendelson, Joseph Solman:The Early Works, Hudson Guild Art Gallery, West 26 Street, New York.
- 2002 Theodore Fried – A Centennial Retrospective, Madelyn Jordon Fine Art Gallery, Scarsdale, NY
- 2006 Theodore Fried: Survival of a Jewish Artist. Sherwin Miller Museum of Jewish Art in Tulsa
- 2013 Bilder aus dem Koffer:Die Sammlung Fritz Grossmann und die Wiederentdeckung von Theodor Fried Zinkenbacher, Malerkolonie Museum at St Gilgen, Austria

== Works in public collections ==
- The Sherwin Miller Museum of Jewish Art, Tulsa, Oklahoma
- Two Pianos Musee National de Art Moderne Paris
- Rockefeller Institute
- The Jewish Museum, New York, NY
- Memorial Art Gallery, Rochester, NY
- Butler Art Institute Youngstown Ohio
- Walker Arts Center Minneapolis
- Le Tueur de Porc Musee De Augustins Toulouse
- Albertina /Belvedere, Vienna
- Victoria & Albert Museum - Etching, woodcuts & Linocuts.
