= Seilern Triptych =

Painting attributed to Robert Campin

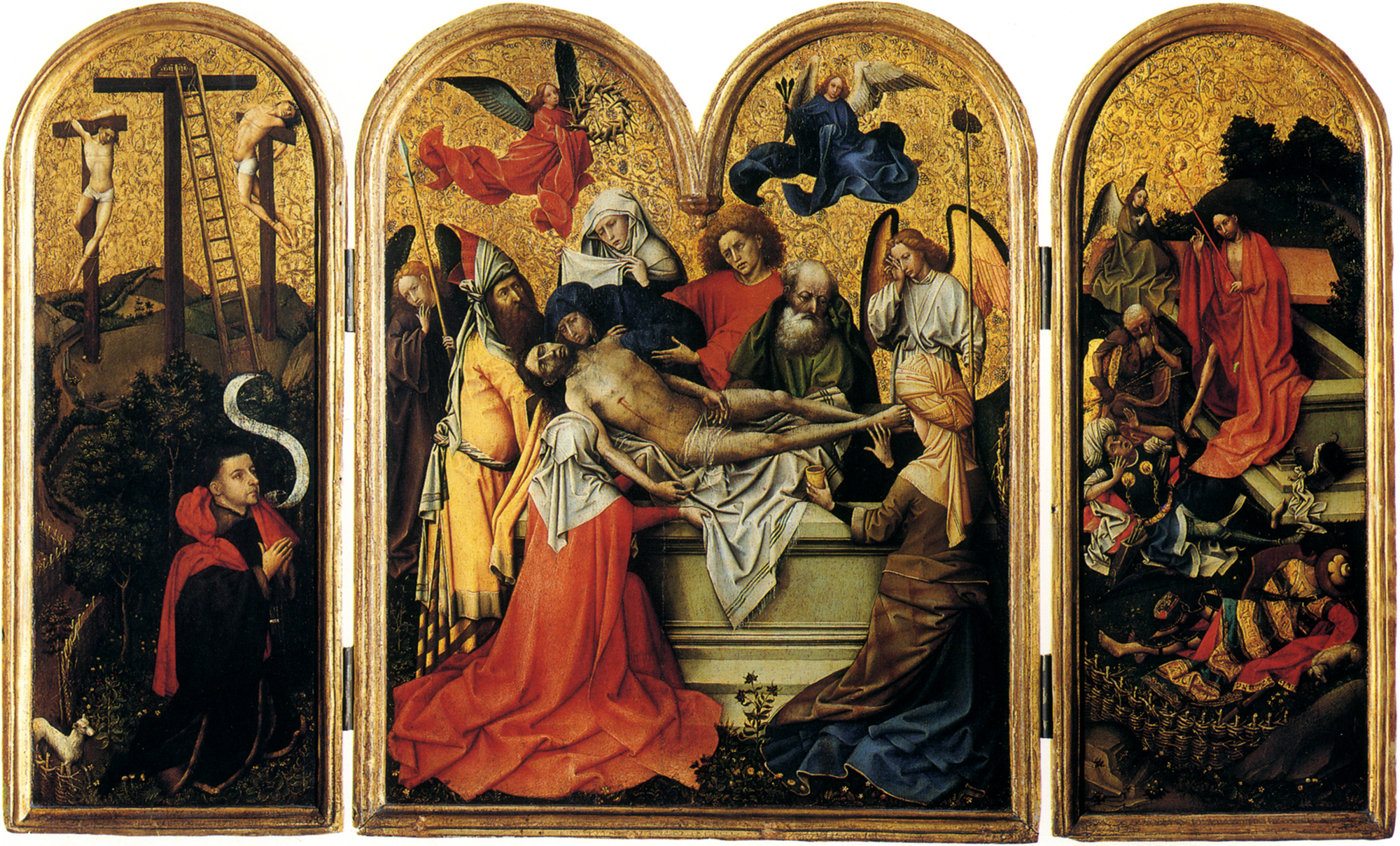
The Seilern Triptych. Oil on panel, 60 x 48.9 cm (central panel without frame), 60 x 22.5 cm (wing without frame)

The Seilern Triptych (also known as Entombment), variously dated c. 1410-15 or c. 1420–25, is a large oil and gold leaf on panel, fixed winged triptych altarpiece generally attributed to the Early Netherlandish painter Robert Campin. It is the earliest of two known triptychs attributed to him, although the outer wing panels paintings are lost. The work details the events of Christ's passion, with iconography associated with the liturgy of Holy Week. The panels, which should be read from left to right, detail three stations of the cycle of the Passion of Jesus; the crucifixion, the burial and the resurrection.

Campin was one of the very early founders of the Northern Renaissance, and was famed and successful in his lifetime for his breakthrough use of oil paints, but was largely forgotten during the early and early-modern period. He was rediscovered during the late 19th century and has since been described as one of the most significant religious painters of the 15th century. Although Campin's life is relatively well documented for the time, there are no surviving records of this commission, and at 60 x 48.9 cm it is too small to have functioned as a church altarpiece - possibly it was intended for private devotion. The triptych represents one of the earliest extant Flemish paintings. Its iconography is related to the Depositio and Elevatio liturgical ceremonies.

The influence of the Seilern Triptych is discernible in works by major artists, including Rogier van der Weyden, Dieric Bouts, Quentin Massys, and Peter Paul Rubens. It is named after its former owner, the Count of Seilern, who bequeathed it to the Courtauld Institute on his death in 1978. The triptych is today housed at the Courtauld Institute, London.

== Description ==
The triptych may have functioned as a funerary altarpiece for a church or, given its relatively compact size, for private devotion. There are no paintings on the exterior, although there may originally have been so. If the work was used in a church, the wings would have been closed except for special occasions such as funerals and Church holidays.

Each of the gold-leaf backgrounds contains wrapping vines, symbols of Christ and painted red currants, both symbols of Christ, the vines of the wine of the Eucharist. The centre panel is double-arched. It is to be read narratively from left to right, with panels showing the crucifixion, entombment and resurrection of Christ. Each of the panels emphasised a different part of the pictorial space; the left-hand panel is focused on the foreground and far background, the centre panel with the foreground, and the right-hand panel with the mid-ground. There are a number of unifying elements across the panels, including the strong use of a deep red and the presence of a dog in each of the wings.

=== Left hand panel ===
The left panel shows the crucifixion scene, but in the aftermath of the Descent from the Cross, suggested by the ladder resting against the central, empty cross. Especial detail is given to the thieves hanging in torment in the left-hand panel, still alive, bound by rope to their crosses and left there even after Christ has been brought down and laid to his tomb. The landscape outlines the hill of Golgotha. It is not especially detailed and lacks perspective.

The donor kneels in veneration in the foreground, a speech scroll or banderole emanating from his lips. He is presented in the scene without an intercessor; usually, this would be a patron saint. His placement in front of an empty cross is highly unusual, but may reflect that donor's devotion to the True Cross. He wears a red garment draped over his shoulder, a colour associated with the triumphant risen Christ.

=== Center panel ===
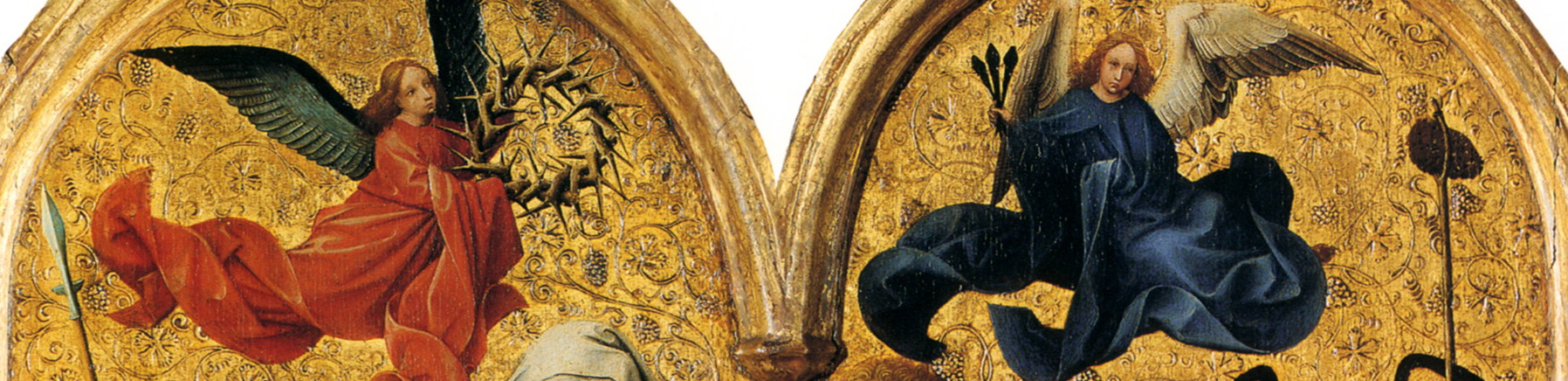
Angels holding instruments of the Passion

The figures in the centre panel are significantly larger and more volumetric, or solid, than those in the wings. Although the panel is connected to the wings by the continuous skyline, the scale and temporal setting of the central panel is very different from that of the wings. The scale is much reduced, and the figures are far more tightly compacted, bringing them much closer to the viewer and setting the scene in a far shallower, less realised space than the wings. Their prominence in the pictorial space has at times been compared to concurrent trends in sculpture, especially by Claus Sluter.

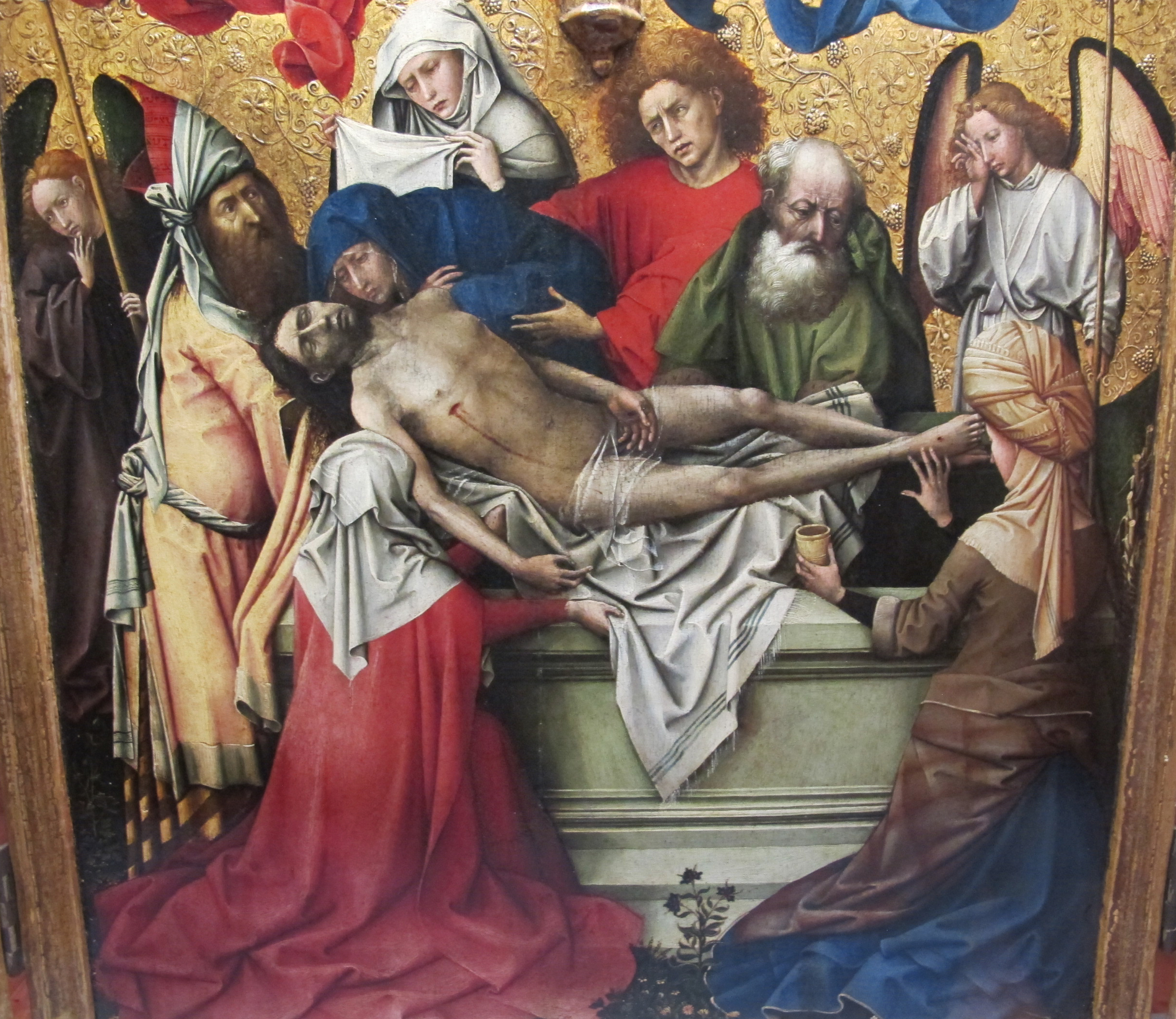
Mourners

Christ's body is raised, perhaps awkwardly, on a shroud above the top slab of the sarcophagus. In this way, the tomb is positioned, as described by art historian Shirley Blum, "the altar supporting Body and Blood of the dead Christ". According to Barbara Lane becomes "both the celebrant and the sacrifice of the constantly repeated Mass".

The mourners gather around the tomb in a semi-circle, looking sorrowfully towards Jesus as he is wrapped in his burial shroud. They include Mary, Joseph of Arimathea (With a brown beard, dressed in pale (now) yellowish clothes and supporting Christ's head) and Nicodemus. Before the tomb, in the mid foreground are Saint John supporting the Virgin, a woman dressed in blue and holding a veil containing the face of Christ who is probably Saint Veronica, and in a symbol of the ritual act of anointing, Mary Magdalene rubs oil on the feet of Christ.

The portrayals of Joseph and Nicodemus are similar to those in Melchior Broederlam's Presentation. Strong emphasis is given to the shroud covering the body of Christ, a motif later seen in works by Jean Michel and Georges de la Sonnette; both pupils of Sluter.

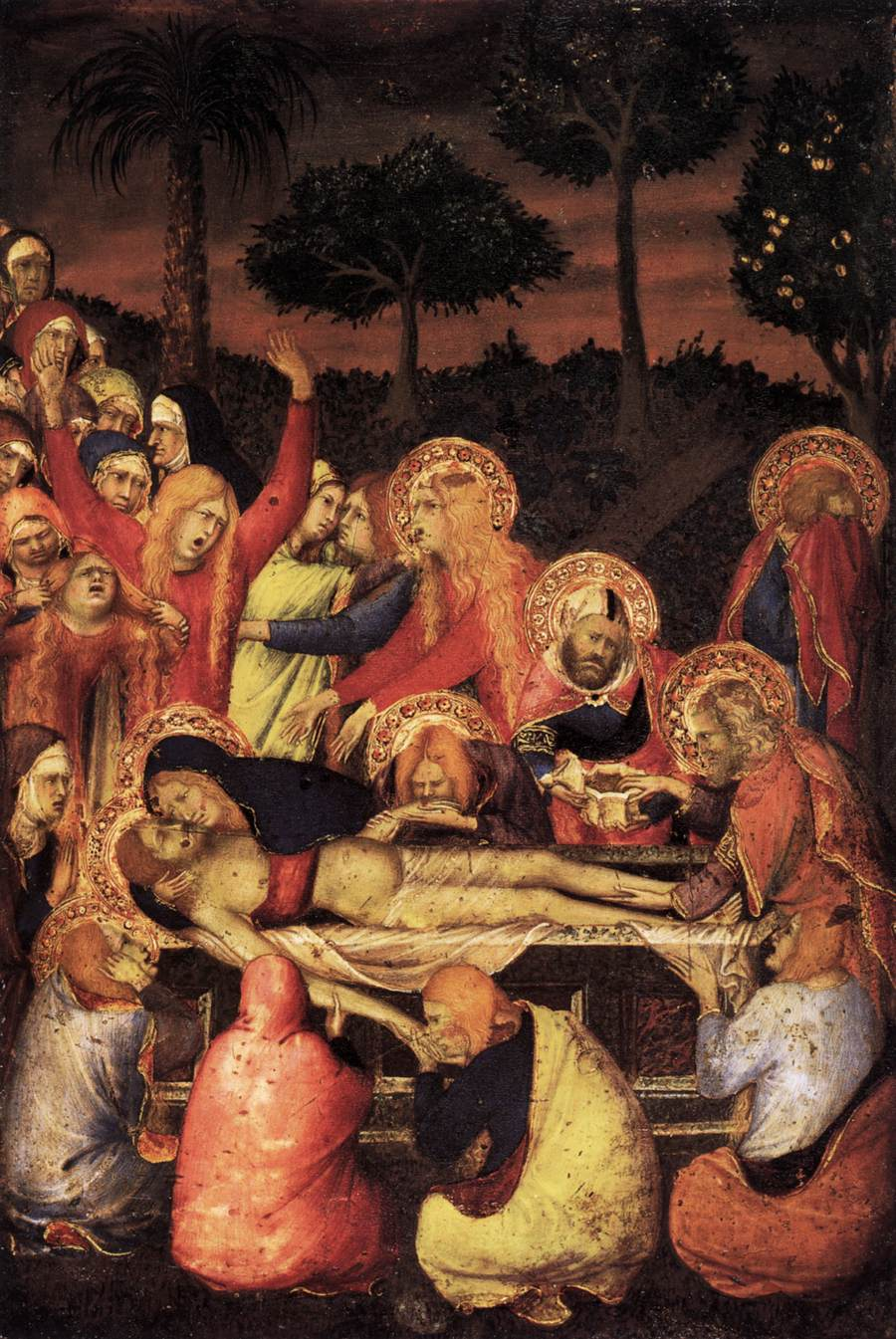
Simone Martini, Entombment, c 1334

Two hovering angels carry the instruments of the Passion, including the sponge, nails and the crown of thorns, represent the Crucifixion. The two angels standing at either side of the tomb are in mourning. The one on the right wipes a tear from his face in grief. This angel wears the liturgical vestments of the priest, including an alb and stole, indicating that he is about to perform Mass. The angel to the right holds a spear, alluding to the crucifixion, and looks downwards towards the donor in the left-hand panel, linking the narrative and panels together.

The central panel has sometimes been compared to Italian equivalents, especially to Simone Martini's c 1334, Entombment, which, since it was taken to Dijon, Campin may have seen first-hand.

=== Right hand panel ===
The right-hand panel shows the resurrection of Jesus. He stands on the tomb after an angel sent by God opens it, and holds the symbol of the Holy Cross as he raises his hands in blessing. Two soldiers sent by Pilate to protect the tomb and prevent the body from being stolen are in the foreground, at the foot of the tomb
