= Adoration of the Shepherds (Parmigianino) =

Painting by Parmigianino

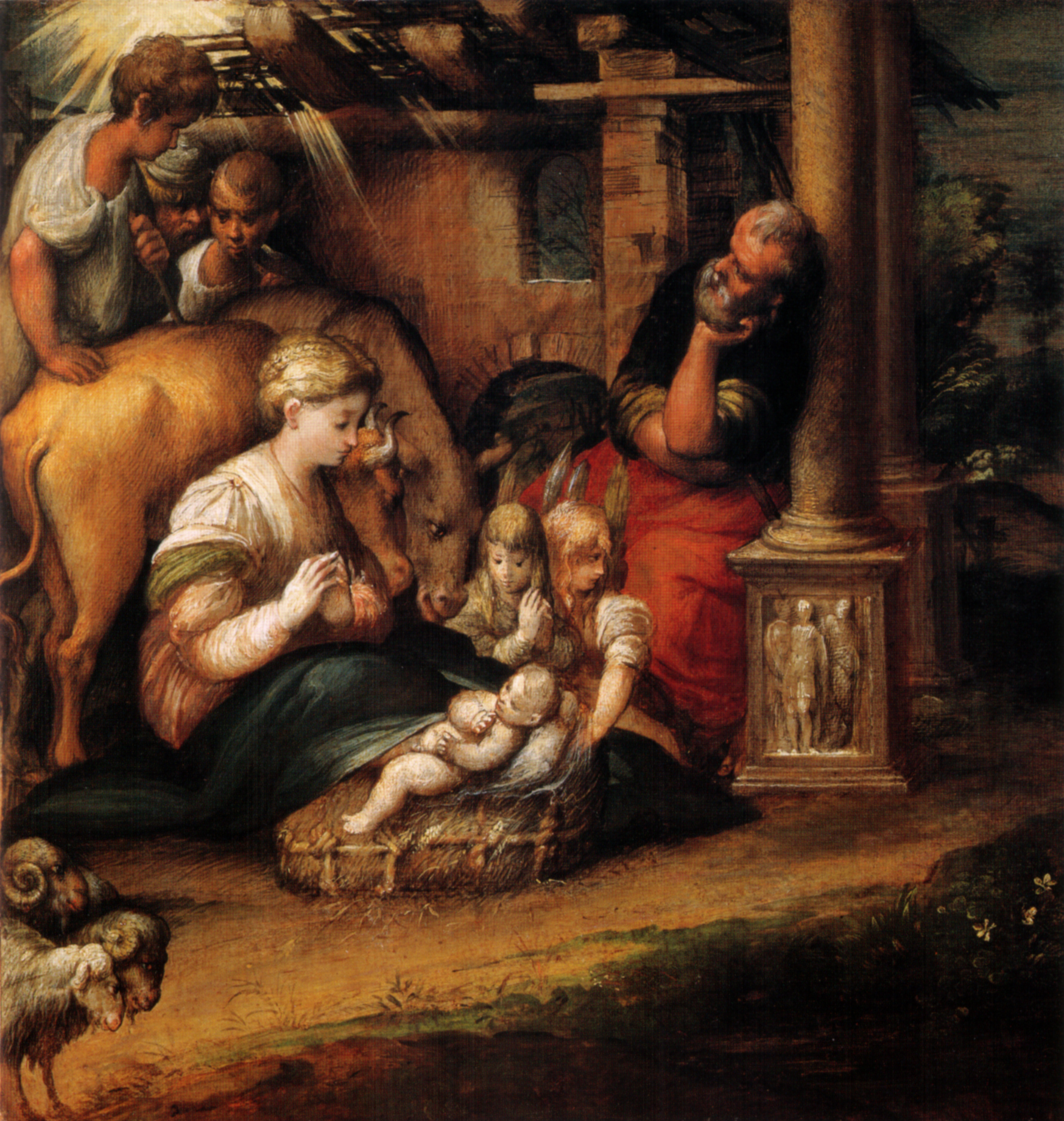
Adoration of the Shepherds (c. 1521–1522) by Parmigianino

Adoration of the Shepherds is an oil on panel painting by Parmigianino, executed c. 1521–1522, now in a private collection. The work was rediscovered by Gould in 1992 and a year later was exhibited at the Kunsthaus Zürich. Like Nativity (Courtauld Gallery), it was identified as a work of the artist's youth, whilst he was still strongly influenced by Correggio, an influence which only faded after 1524.

A preparatory drawing for the Madonna, angels and Joseph survives in a London private collection and was exhibited in Washington and Parma, also showing the influence of Correggio, whilst the two rams and a lamb in the bottom left may be a tribute to the bucranium in that painter's Camera di San Paolo. Another drawing in the Cleveland Museum of Art (inv. 24–10003) may be a first idea for the composition, later elaborated.
