= Edgeborough School =

Location
- Edgeborough; Frensham; Farnham, Surrey, GU10 3AH; England; 51.18297°N 0.79455°W

Information
- Type: Prep school
- Motto: Carpe Diem (Seize the day)
- Established: 1906
- Local authority: Surrey
- Department for Education URN: 125337 Tables
- Head: Daniel Cox
- Gender: Coeducational
- Age: 3 to 13
- Enrolment: 370
- Houses: James; Keville; Jackson; Burton
- Colours: Green and gold
- Website: http://www.edgeborough.co.uk

Edgeborough School is a coeducational day preparatory school near the town of Farnham, in Surrey, England. It is currently attended by ~360 children between the ages of two and thirteen. The Head is Daniel Cox, former Deputy Head of Lambrook School in Ascot, Berkshire.

== Overview ==
Edgeborough became co-educational in 1992 and celebrated its centenary in 2006. The Head is Daniel Cox, former Deputy Head of Lambrook School, Ascot. Its grounds measure ~50 acres, including parts of its. Frensham Place, a former country house

The school offers extracurricular sporting activities including athletics, badminton, basketball, canoeing, a climbing wall, cricket, cross country, football, golf, gymnastics, hockey, lacrosse, martial arts, netball, rounders, rugby, swimming, table tennis, tennis and volleyball

== Facilities ==
Buildings and grounds include a floodlit astroturf pitch, theatre, dance studio, chapel and an open-air swimming pool. In addition, there are several pitches and two cricket pavilions, an astro cricket strip one of which has a mechanical score board. In the year 2000, the school underwent a building and rebuilding program, replacing its library and building its science labs. The Year-6-to-8 classroom block was renovated and a dance studio was built.

== History ==
Edgeborough was established in 1906 in Guildford as a small, privately owned boarding school for boys. It moved to its present site in Frensham in 1939. It became a charitable trust in 1966, and co-education was introduced in 1992 when the Pre-Prep and Nursery departments were opened.

Frensham Place, which now houses the school's weekly boarders, was built about 1880. It is an imposing stone building with shaped gables which the school has not had listed. Two cottages by the walled garden area were designed by the architect Edwin Lutyens. Frensham Place was the former home of the Woodroffe family, and the house's chapel was the first place of worship for Catholics from Farnham since the Reformation. Local masses were celebrated by the Woodroffe's chaplain Father Gerin, who had come to Farnham in 1888 to escape persecution in France.

The building was also the former home of the newspaper proprietor and magnate Sir Cyril Arthur Pearson, the founder of the Daily Express. Pearson died at the house after hitting his head on the bath tap. The contents of the house, including all Pearson's furniture and pictures, were put up for sale in 1913.

Frensham Place was also the birthplace of Count Antoine Seilern, one of the most noted art collectors of the twentieth century. He was born at the house on 17 September 1901, the son of an Austrian nobleman Count Carl Seilern and his American wife Antoinette Woerishoffer.

== Notable former pupils ==
- Keith Douglas, poet
- Sir John Bertrand Gurdon, Nobel Prize Winner 2012. Developmental biologist.
- B. H. Liddell Hart, soldier, military historian and inter-war theorist
- Wilfred St Aubyn Malleson, recipient of the Victoria Cross at Gallipoli
- Toby Roberts, Olympic gold medallist climber
- Murray Seasongood, politician and former mayor of Cincinnati, Ohio
- John Strachey, politician
- Bob Tisdall, Olympic gold medallist hurdler
