= Virgin and Child (Parmigianino) =

Painting by Parmigianino

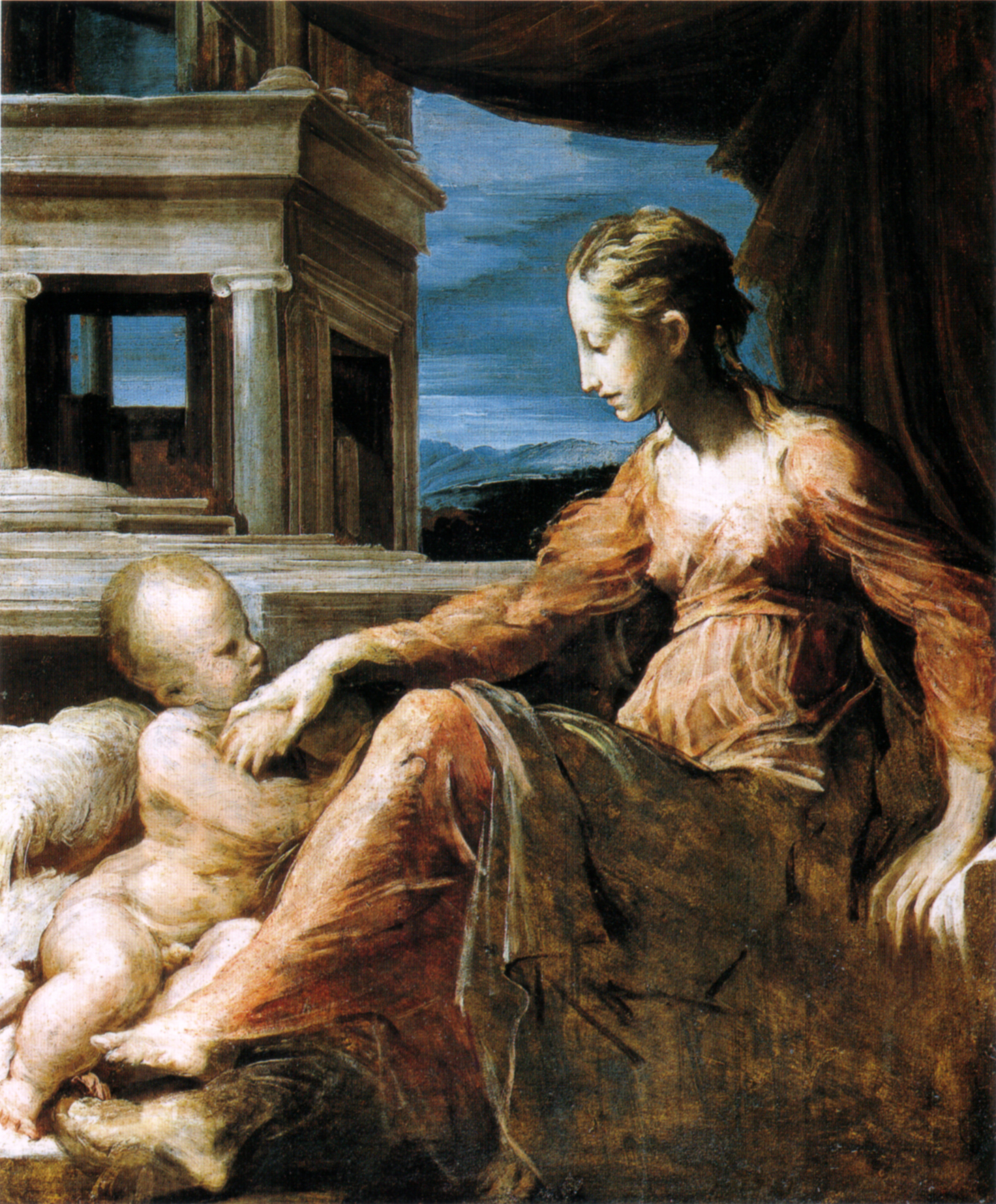
Virgin and Child (c. 1527–1528) by Parmigianino

Virgin and Child is an unfinished c. 1527–1528 oil on panel painting by Parmigianino, now in the Courtauld Gallery, in London.

== History and description ==
As it is usually identified with one which Giorgio Vasari sketched in Bologna and later bought for himself, it is sometimes also known as the Vasari Madonna. The work passed through unknown hands after Vasari, eventually ending up in Lord Kinnard's collection, from whose successors Antoine Seilern acquired it via Colnaghi in 1965 before bequeathing it to the Courtauld in 1978.

A preparatory drawing in the Albertina in Vienna shows an angel omitted from the final work. The architectural background of the painting is complete, but traces of the underdrawing and preparation still show behind both the Madonna and Child, with much of her mantle still unpainted. That background draws on Roman examples and refers to Raphael's Madonnas, whilst the Madonna's pose draws on that of the Erythraean Sibyl in Michelangelo's Sistine Chapel ceiling and a very similar Christ Child appears in Parmigianino's Santa Margherita Madonna (1530). Some critics argue that this dates the work to his stay in Rome just before moving to Bologna, whilst others theorise he may have left it incomplete due to the Sack of Rome in 1527.
