= Red currant =

Red currant is a common name for several plants and may refer to:

- Ribes rubrum, a shrub native to western Europe and widely cultivated
- Ribes sanguineum, a shrub native to North America
- Searsia chirindensis, a tree native to southern Africa
