= Schönbühel-Aggsbach =

- Municipality
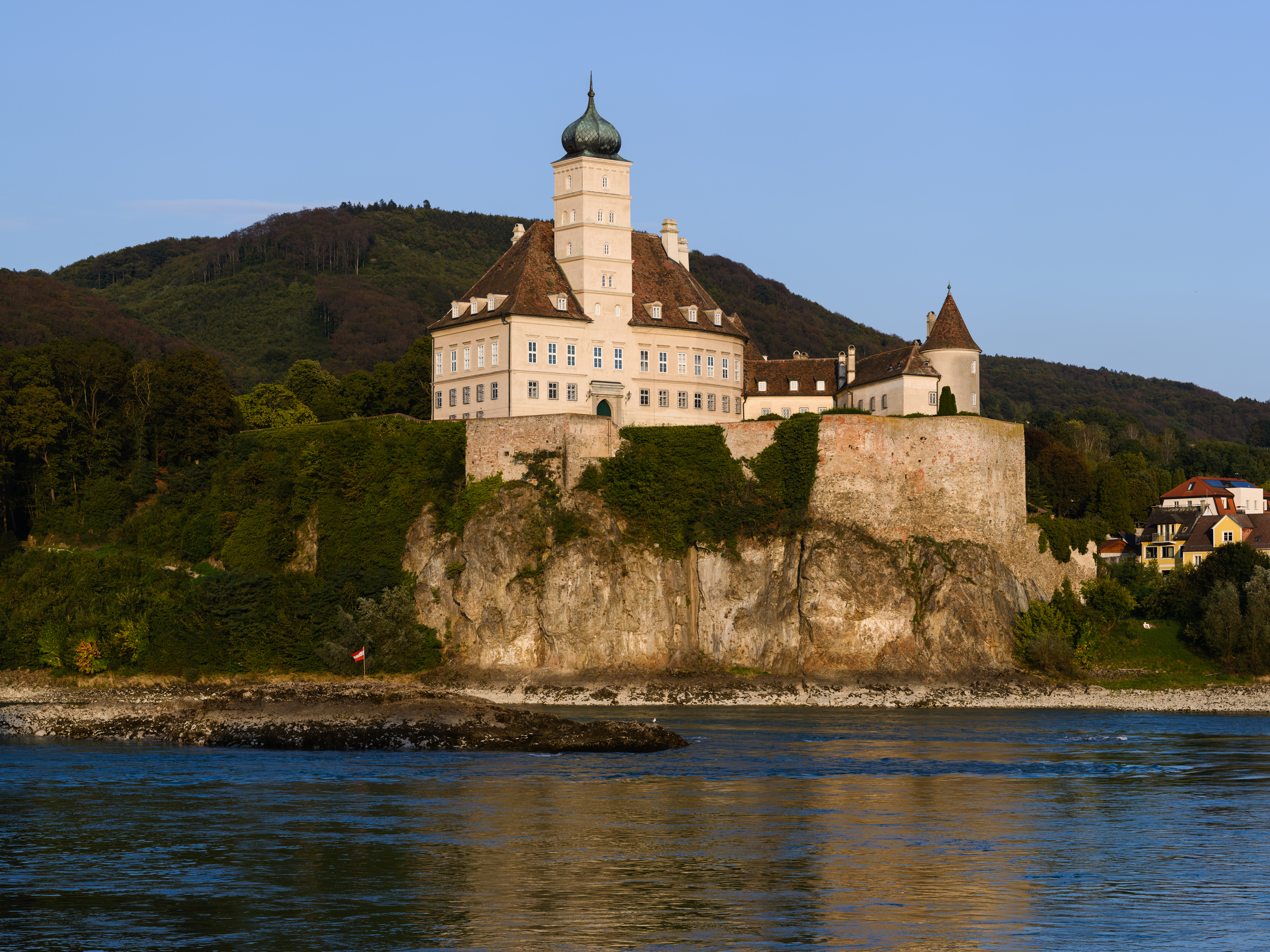
- Schönbühel Castle

- Coat of arms

- Location within Austria
- Coordinates: 48°17′N 15°44′E
- Country: Austria
- State: Lower Austria
- District: Melk

Government
  - Mayor: Erich Ringseis (ÖVP)

Area
  - Total: 28.37 km^{2} (10.95 sq mi)
- Elevation: 210 m (690 ft)

Population (2018-01-01)
  - Total: 981
  - Density: 34.6/km^{2} (89.6/sq mi)
- Time zone: UTC+1 (CET)
  - Summer (DST): UTC+2 (CEST)
- Postal code: 3392, 3642
- Area code: 02753
- Website: www.schoenbuehel.at

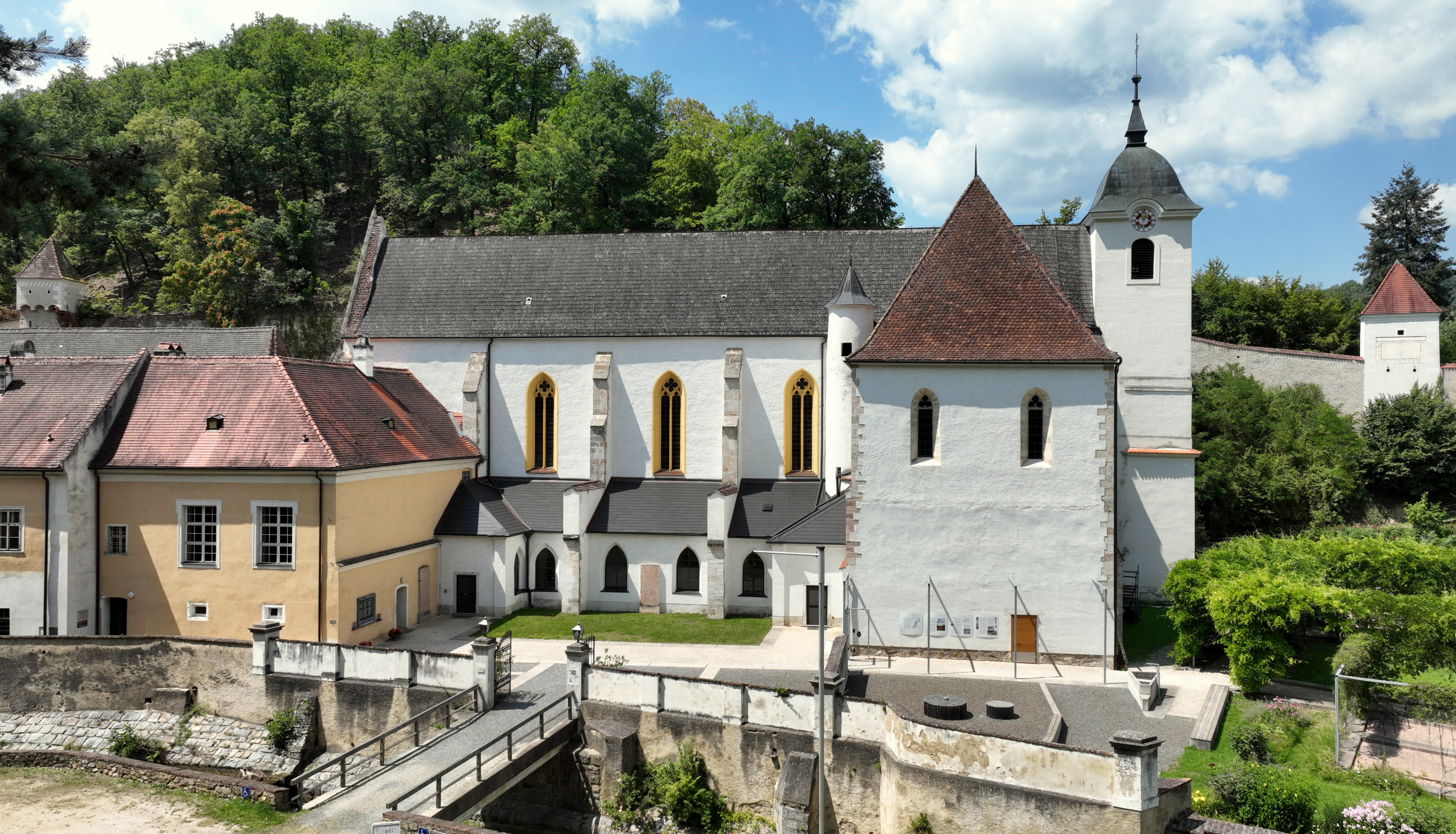
Aggsbach-Dorf - Kirche

Schönbühel-Aggsbach is a town in the district of Melk in the Austrian state of Lower Austria.

== Population ==
Historical population
Year	Pop.	±%
1971	1,017	—
1981	1,051	+3.3%
1991	1,045	−0.6%
2001	1,033	−1.1%
