= Man and Woman =

Man and Woman may refer to:

- Man and Woman (1919 film), a Tyrad Pictures film
- Man and Woman (film), a 1920 American silent film drama
- Man and Woman (Fernand Léger), a 1921 oil on canvas painting
- Man & Woman (album), a 1974 album by George Freeman
- Man and Woman (TV series), a 2023 South Korean television series

== See also ==
- Men and Women (disambiguation)
- A Man and a Woman (disambiguation)
- Adam and Eve
- "Woman and Man", a 2007 song by Ween from the album La Cucaracha
- Man and Wife (disambiguation)
