= Marriage of the Virgin (disambiguation) =

The Marriage of the Virgin is a subject in Christian art depicting the marriage of the Virgin Mary and Saint Joseph.

Marriage of the Virgin may also refer to:

- Espousals of the Blessed Virgin Mary, a Christian feast observed on January 23
- Marriage of the Virgin (Giordano), c. 1688
- Marriage of the Virgin (Campin)
- Marriage of the Virgin (El Greco), 1603–1605
- The Marriage of the Virgin (Michelino da Besozzo), c. 1435
- Marriage of the Virgin (Perugino), 1504
- The Marriage of the Virgin (Raphael), 1504
- Marriage of the Virgin (Rosso Fiorentino), 1523
