= Espousals of the Blessed Virgin Mary =

Christian feast day

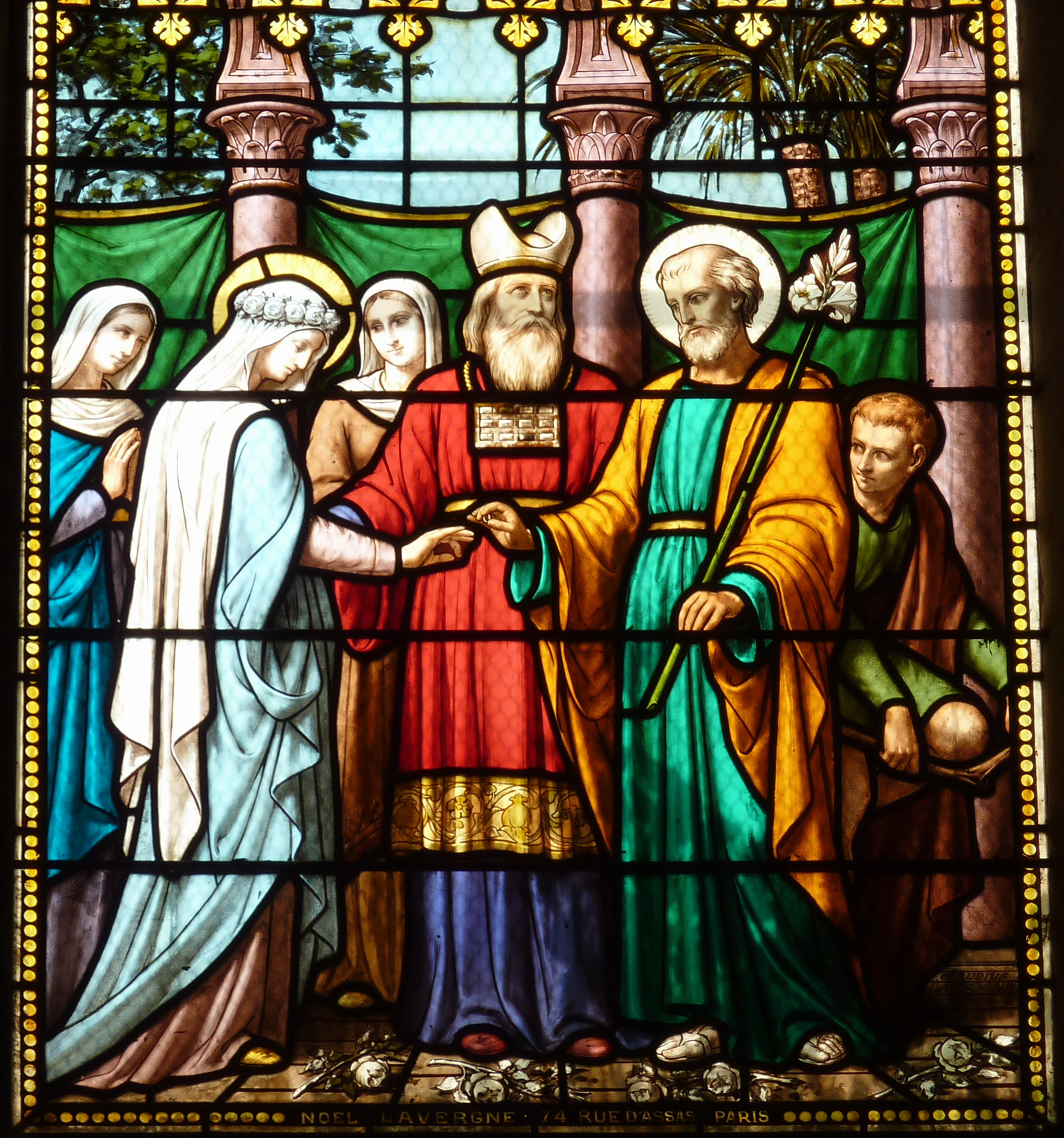
- Marriage of the Virgin, Saint-Quiriace de Provins
- Observed by: Catholic Church
- Type: Christian
- Date: 23 January
- Frequency: Annual

The Espousals of the Blessed Virgin Mary or Marriage of the Virgin Mary is a feast that is celebrated by some communities within the Catholic Church, such as the Oblates of Saint Joseph. It was formerly generally observed on January 23, but was removed from many local calendars by the Sacred Congregation of Rites.

== History ==
In Matthew 1:16, Joseph is described as the husband of Mary. It is probable that Joseph and Mary were betrothed in Nazareth. The term "betrothal" indicates more than the modern sense of an engagement, as it was customary in that time and place to celebrate marriage in two stages. The first phase (erusin) was the contractual arrangements culminating in consent or betrothal. After a period of around one year in which the couple were preparing for conjugal living, the second stage (nissuin) saw the wife physically conveyed to the new home, accompanied by a great feast such as the Marriage Feast at Cana recounted in John 2:1-11.

== Liturgy ==
In 1416 Jean Gerson, Chancellor of the University of Paris urged the Council of Constance to establish a feast honouring the betrothal of Mary and Joseph, for which he wrote an office.

The first definite knowledge of a feast in honour of the espousals of Mary dates from August 29, 1517, when with nine other masses in honour of Mary, it was granted by Pope Leo X´ to the Order of the Annunciation of the Blessed Virgin Mary, founded by Jeanne de Valois. In certain particular churches the espousals of the Virgin Mary and Saint Joseph are honoured with an office on January 23. The Oblates of Saint Joseph celebrate 23 January as the feast of The Holy Spouses Mary and Joseph.

Gaspar Bertoni, the founder of the Stigmatines, chose Mary and Joseph in the context of their espousals, as patrons of the Congregation of the Sacred Stigmata.

== In art ==
In art the subject can be covered in several different scenes, and the betrothal of Mary, with Joseph's blossoming rod, is often shown. Wedding processions are also shown, especially in the Early Medieval period. The scene, or scenes, is a common component in larger cycles of the Life of the Virgin and thus very frequently found, especially in the Middle Ages; it is not found in the typical cycle in a Book of hours.

The marriage scene has been painted by, among others, Giotto, Perugino, Raphael, Domenico Ghirlandaio, Bernardo Daddi (now in the Royal Collection), Veronese (in San Polo church, Venice), and Pieter van Lint (1640, Antwerp Cathedral). The subject is depicted in a fresco in the German Chapel at the Shrine of the Holy House in Loretto, Italy; in a sculpture in the left portico of Sagrada Família Basilica in Barcelona, Spain; and in a stained glass window at St. Rita Basilica, Cascia, Italy.

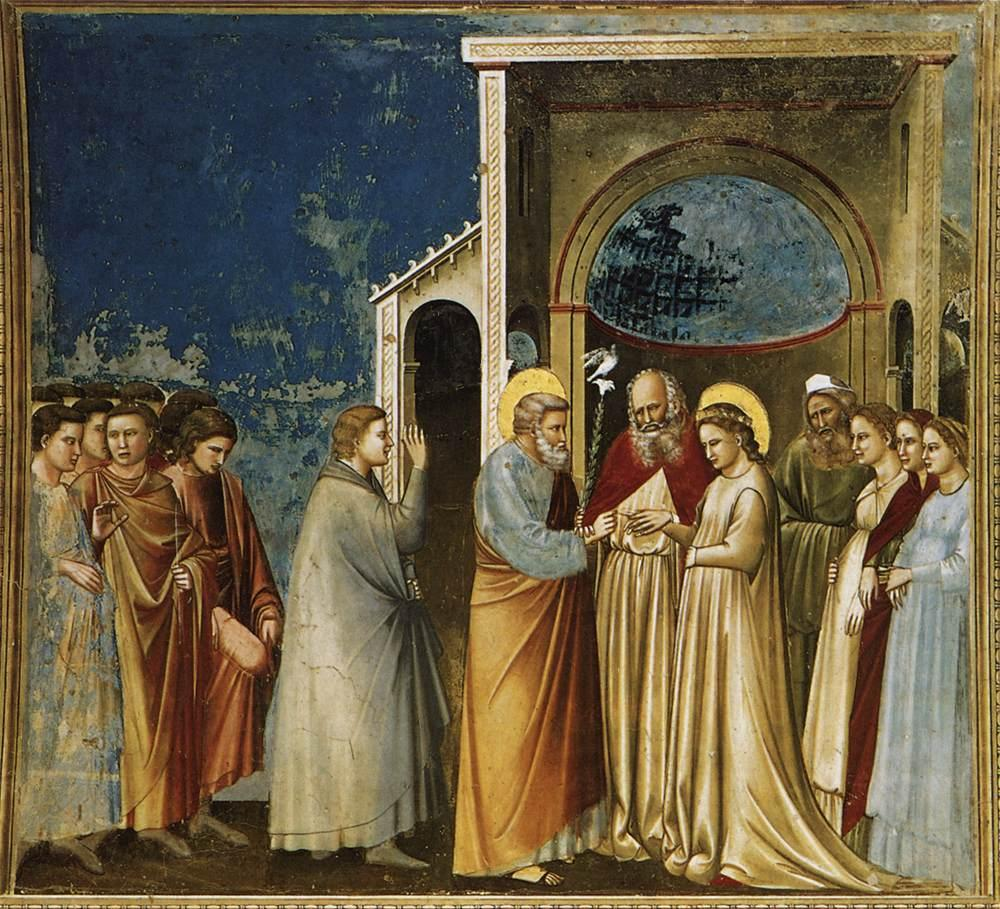
Marriage of the Virgin by Giotto, c. 1305

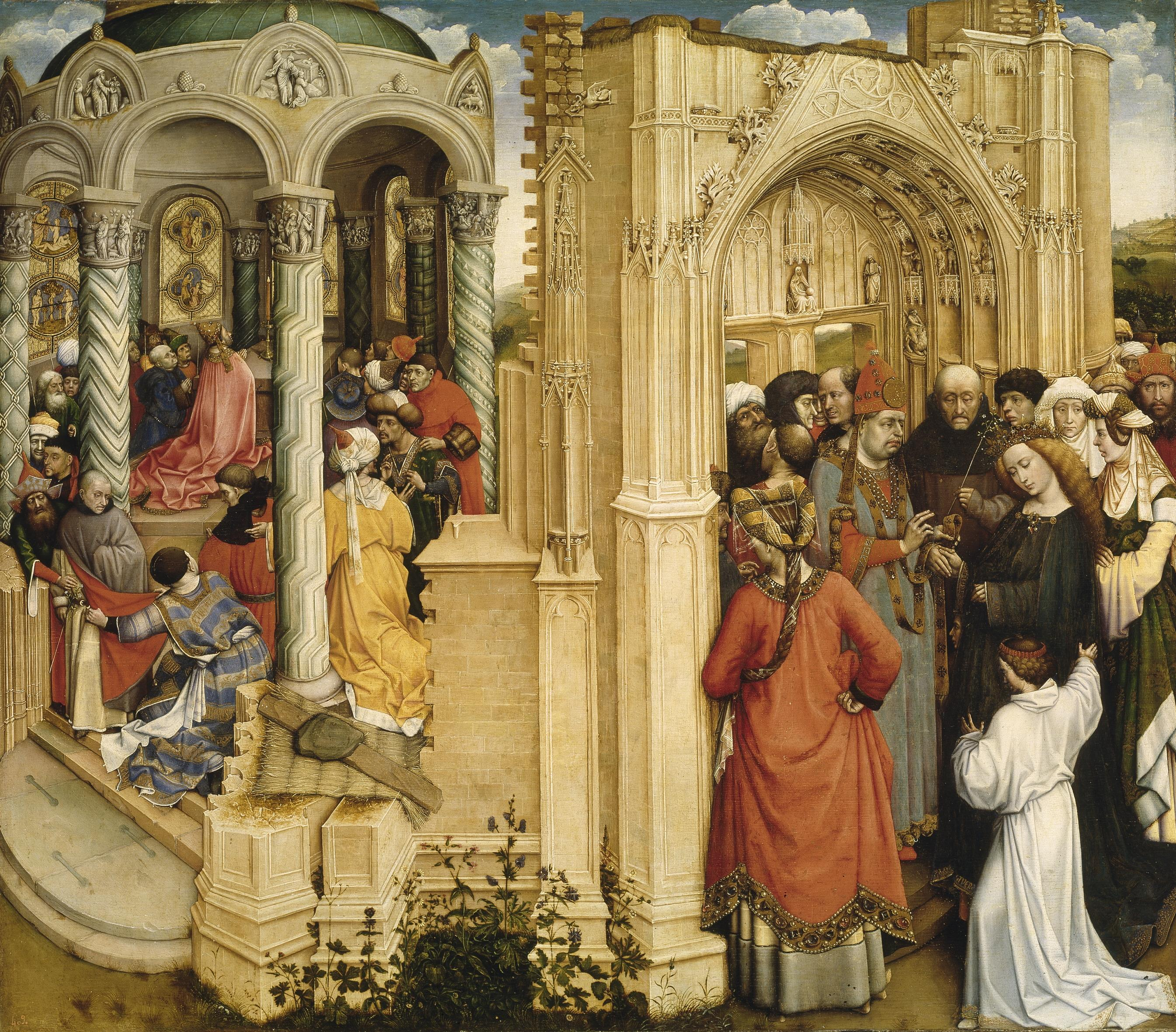
Marriage of the Virgin by Robert Campin, c. 1420-1430

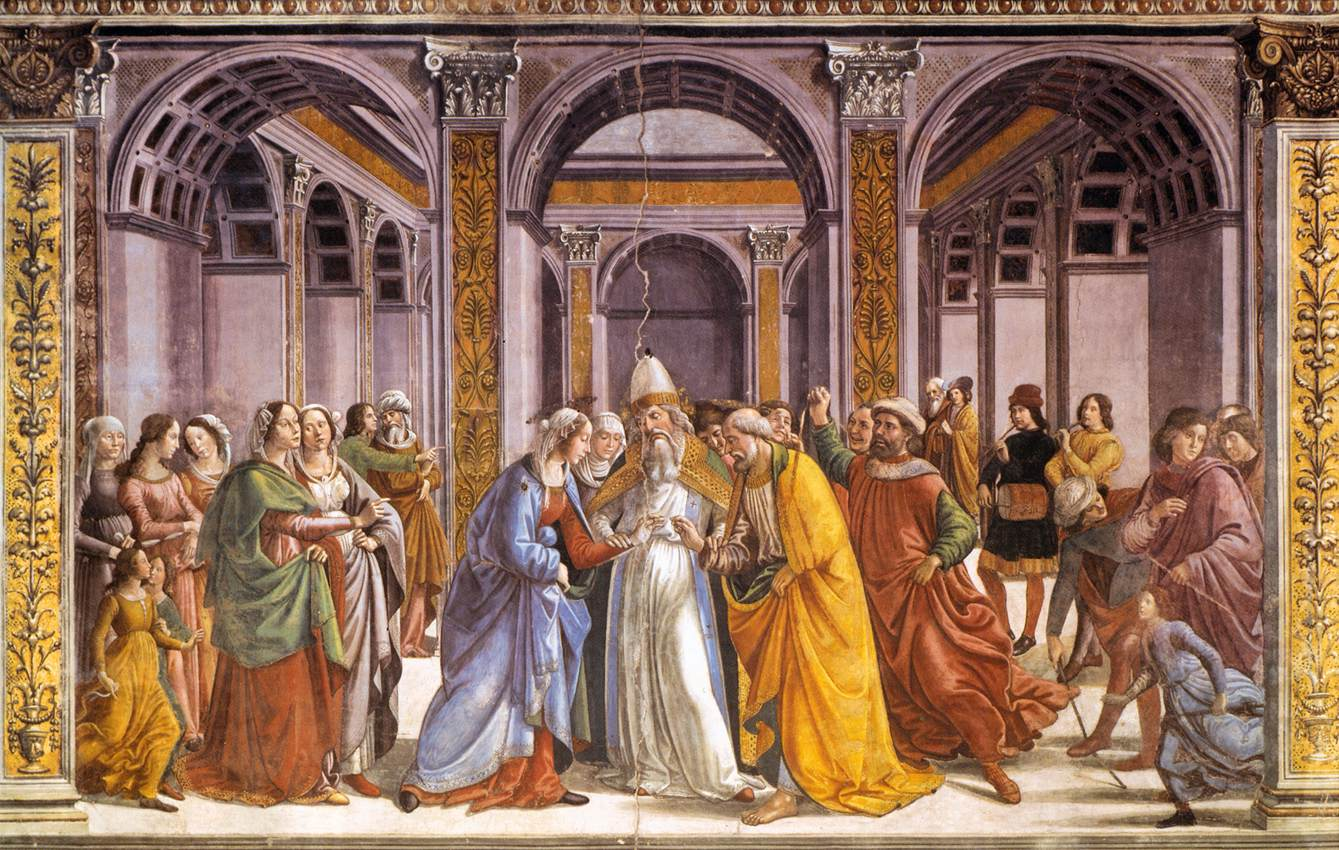
Marriage of Mary by Domenico Ghirlandaio, 1485-1490, at the Tornabuoni Chapel

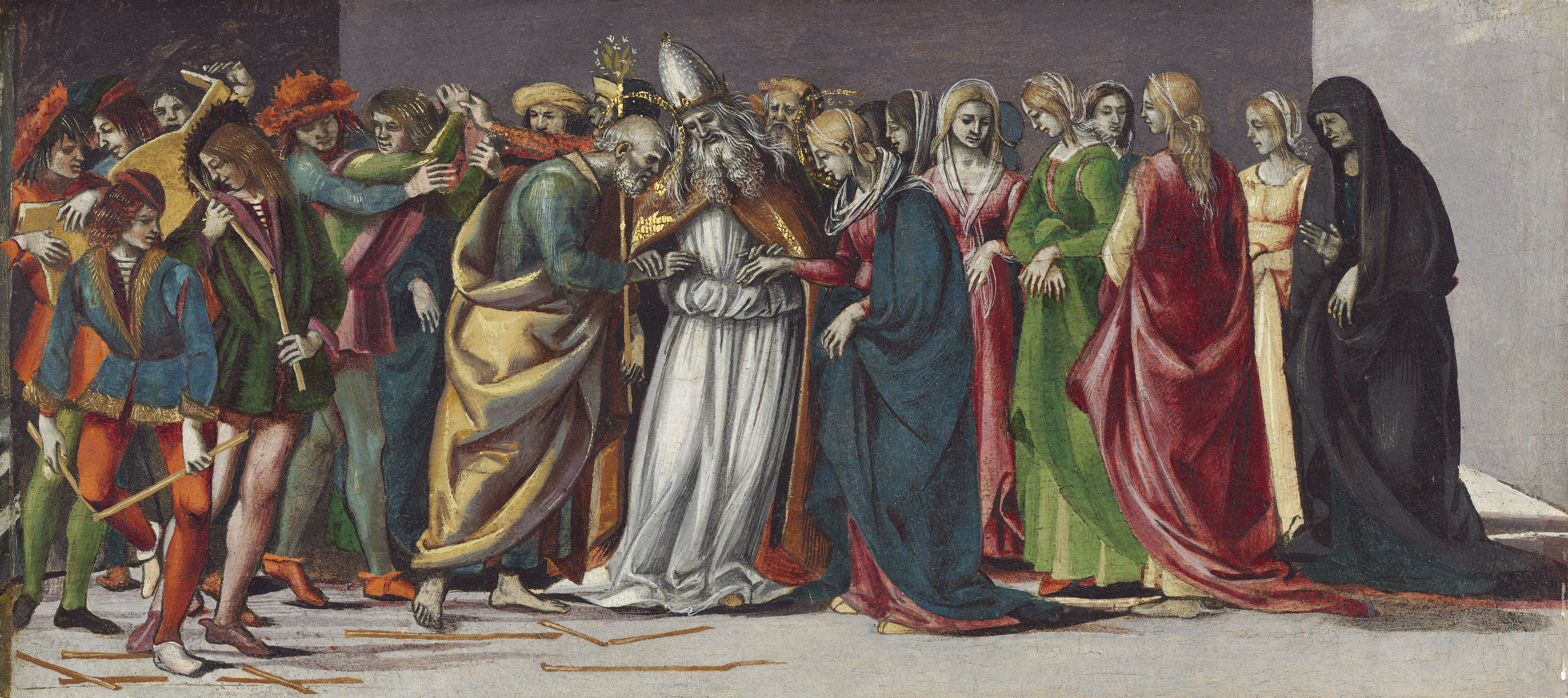
The Marriage of the Virgin by Luca Signorelli c. 1490-1491

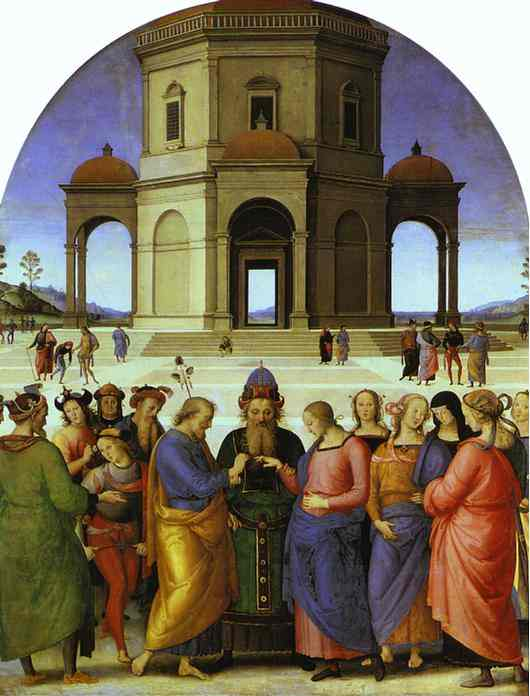
Marriage of the Virgin by Perugino, 1500-1504

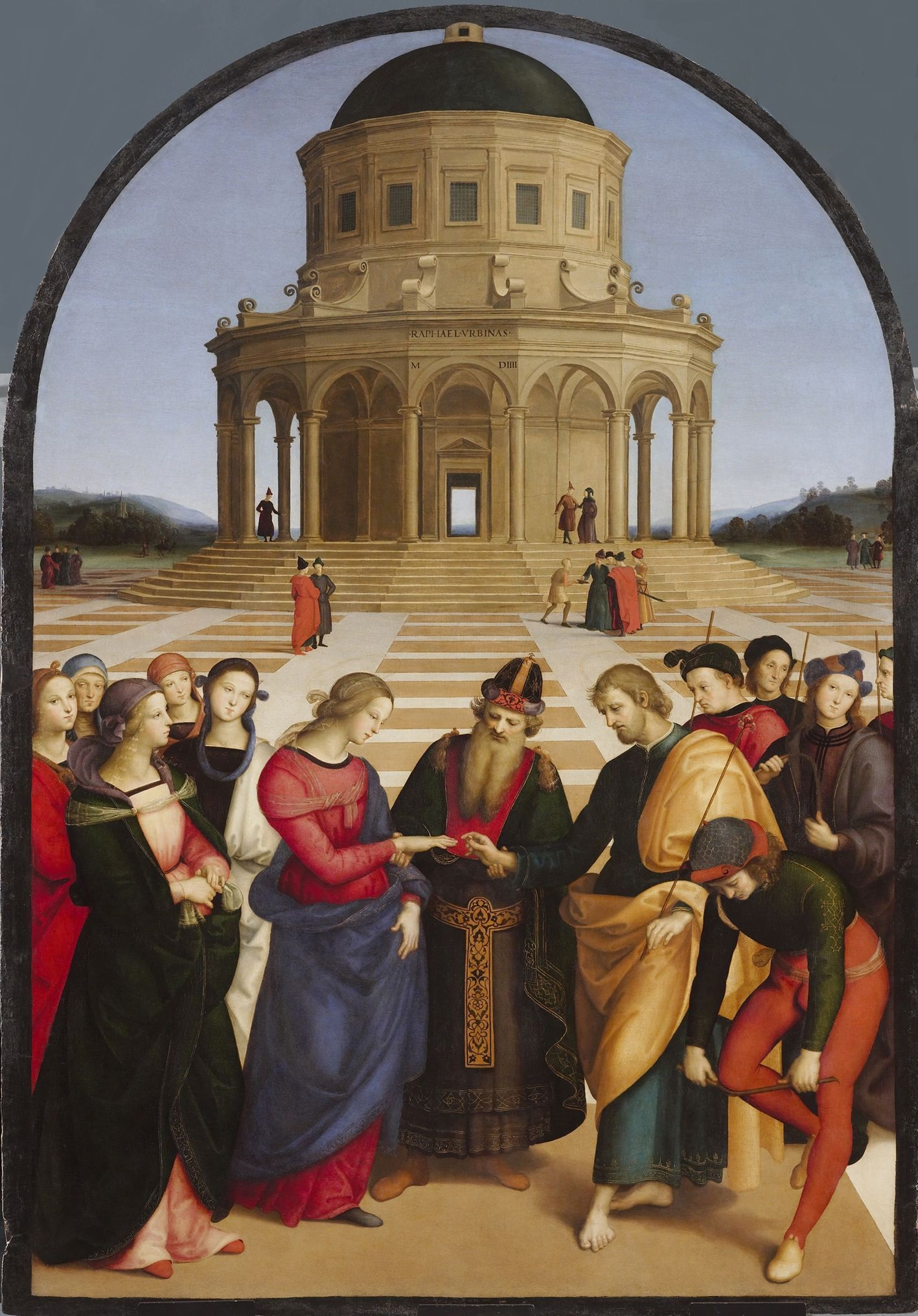
The Marriage of the Virgin by Raphael, 1504

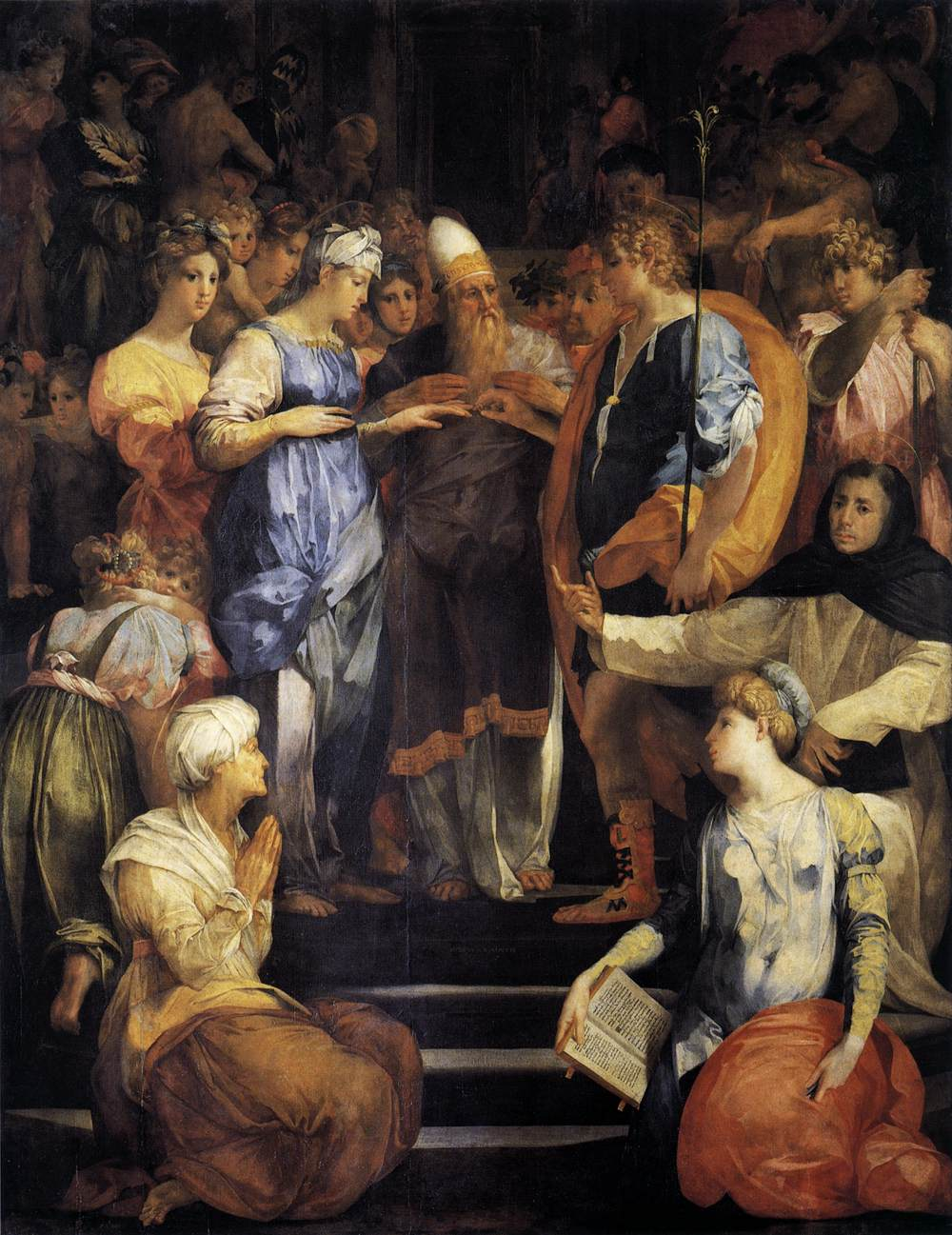
Betrothal of the Virgin by Rosso Fiorentino, 1523
