= Men and Women =

Men and Women may refer to:

- Adults

== Film ==
- Men and Women (1914 film), a silent short film
- Men and Women (1925 film), a silent film starring Richard Dix
- Men and Women (1964 film), a Brazilian film
- Men and Women (1999 film), an LGBT Chinese film

== Music ==
- Men and Women (album), a 1987 album by Simply Red

== Other uses ==
- Men and Women (play), an 1890 play written by David Belasco
- Men and Women (poetry collection), an 1855 poetry collection by Robert Browning
- Men and Women (newspaper supplement), a defunct glossy supplement for the Indian paper, The Times of India

== See also ==
- Man and Woman (disambiguation)
- Women and Men, a 1987 novel
