= A Man and a Woman (disambiguation) =

A Man and a Woman is a 1966 French film directed by Claude Lelouch.

A Man and a Woman may also refer to:

== Film and television ==
- The Secret Lovers, also known as A Man and a Woman, a 2005 South Korean television series
- A Man and a Woman (2016 film), a South Korean film directed by Lee Yoon-ki
- A Man and a Woman: 20 Years Later, a 1986 French drama film, a sequel to the 1966 film

== Music ==
- A Man and a Woman (Johnny Lytle album), 1967
- A Mann & a Woman, an album by Herbie Mann and Tamiko Jones, 1967
- A Man and a Woman (Isaac Hayes and Dionne Warwick album), 1977
- "A Man and a Woman" ("Un homme et une femme" in French), title song of the 1966 film A Man and a Woman
- "A Man and a Woman" (song), by U2, 2004

== Other uses ==
- A Man and A Woman (Campin), a c. 1435 painting by Robert Campin

== See also ==
- A Woman & a Man, an album by Belinda Carlisle
- Man and Woman (disambiguation)
