= Jacques Daret =

Netherlandish painter (c.1404–c.1470)

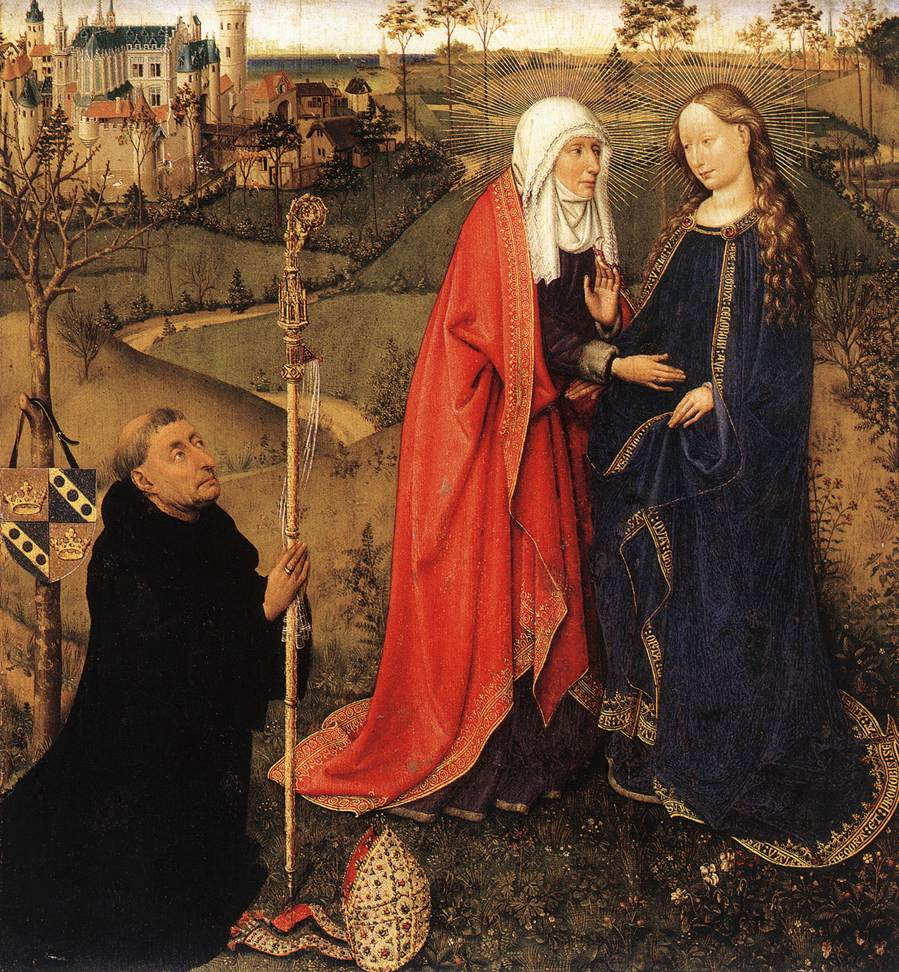
The Visitation, from Altarpiece of the Virgin by Jacques Daret, 1434–35.

Jacques Daret (c. 1404 – c. 1470) was an Early Netherlandish painter born in Tournai (now in Belgium), where he would spend much of his life. Daret spent 15 years as a pupil in the studio of Robert Campin, alongside Rogier or Rogelet de le Pasture (Rogier van der Weyden), and afterwards became a master in his own right. He became a favorite of the Burgundian court, and his patron for 20 years was the abbot of St. Vaast in Arras, Jean de Clercq.

Though many works of Daret are mentioned in Jean de Clercq's account books, only four panels have survived: all are from the so-called Arras Altarpiece or Saint-Vaast Altarpiece, painted for the abbot between 1433 and 1435. These paintings show a striking resemblance to the Flemish realism of the Master of Flémalle. This is argued by most scholars to be evidence that the Master of Flémalle was Daret's master, Robert Campin.

Daret features rather more in the art historical debates over his period than the merit of his work alone would justify because he is relatively well-documented, and in particular can be securely identified as the creator of the altarpiece mentioned above, as well as a pupil of Campin. The stylistic similarity between him and the Master of Flémalle is therefore crucial evidence in the identification of the latter with Campin. This then becomes an important connection in establishing a link between Robert Campin/the Master of Flémalle and his other major pupil, Rogier van der Weyden.

== Arras Altarpiece ==
Daret's four surviving securely identified works, all from the Arras Altarpiece, are the Visitation and Adoration of the Magi (both Gemäldegalerie, Berlin), the Nativity (Thyssen-Bornemisza Museum, Madrid), and the Presentation in the Temple (Petit Palais, Paris).

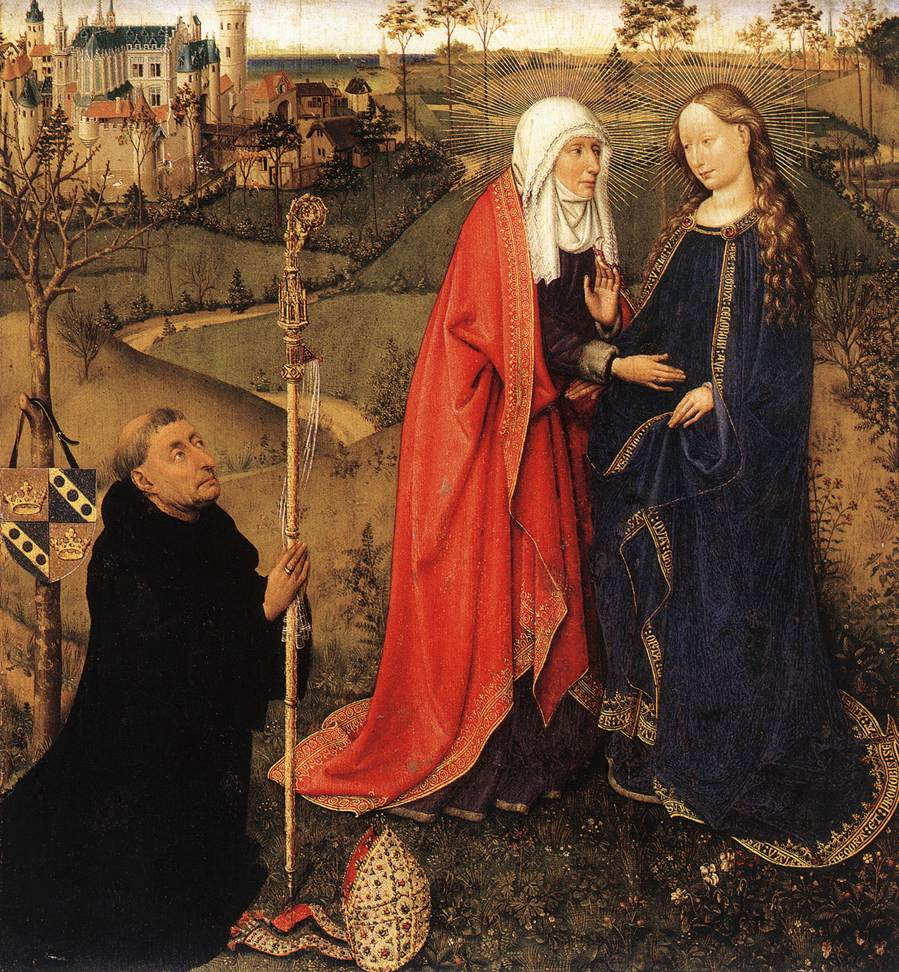
The Visitation, by Jacques Daret, c. 1434

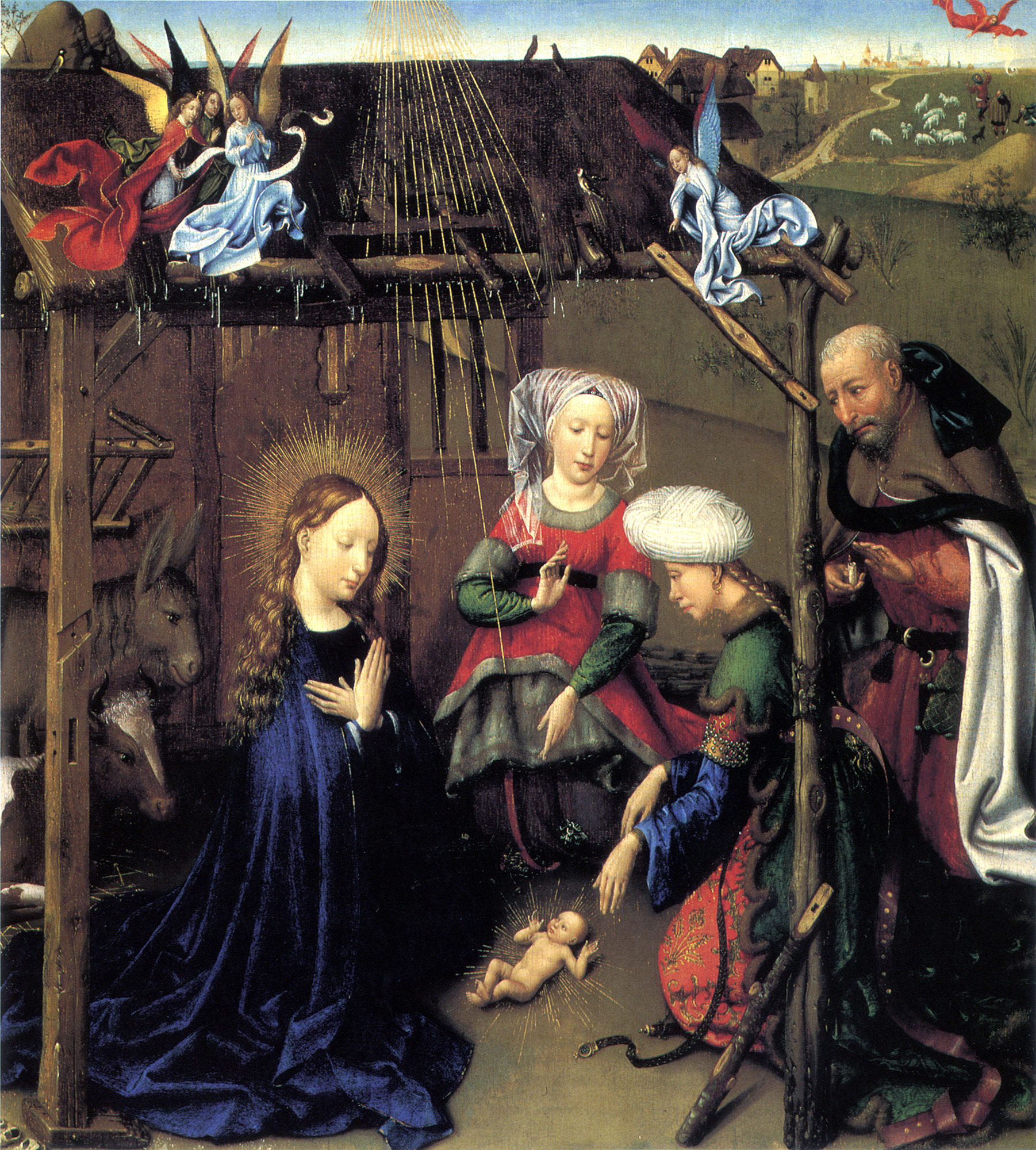
The Nativity, by Jacques Daret c. 1434

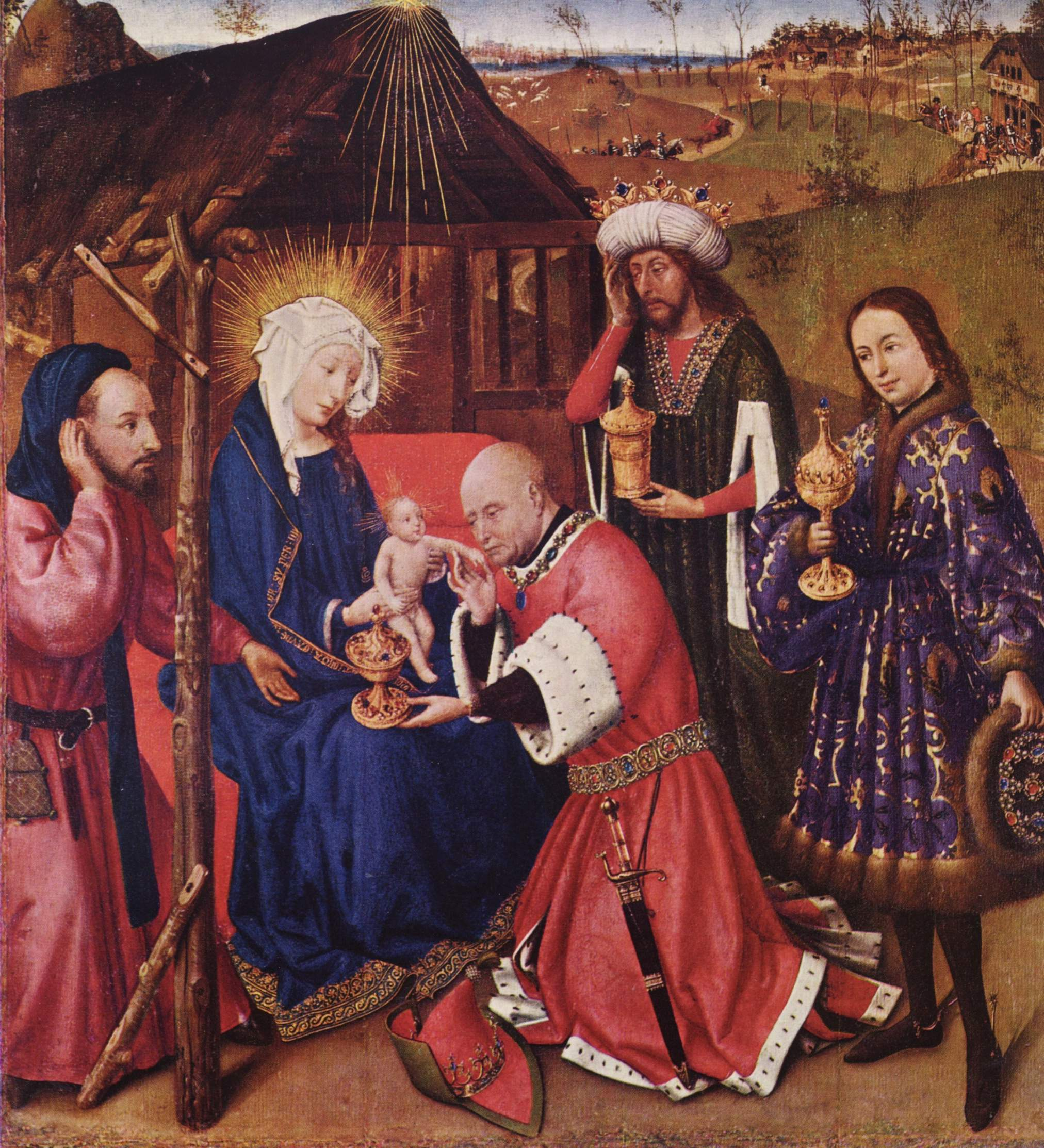
Adoration of the Magi, by Jacques Daret c. 1434

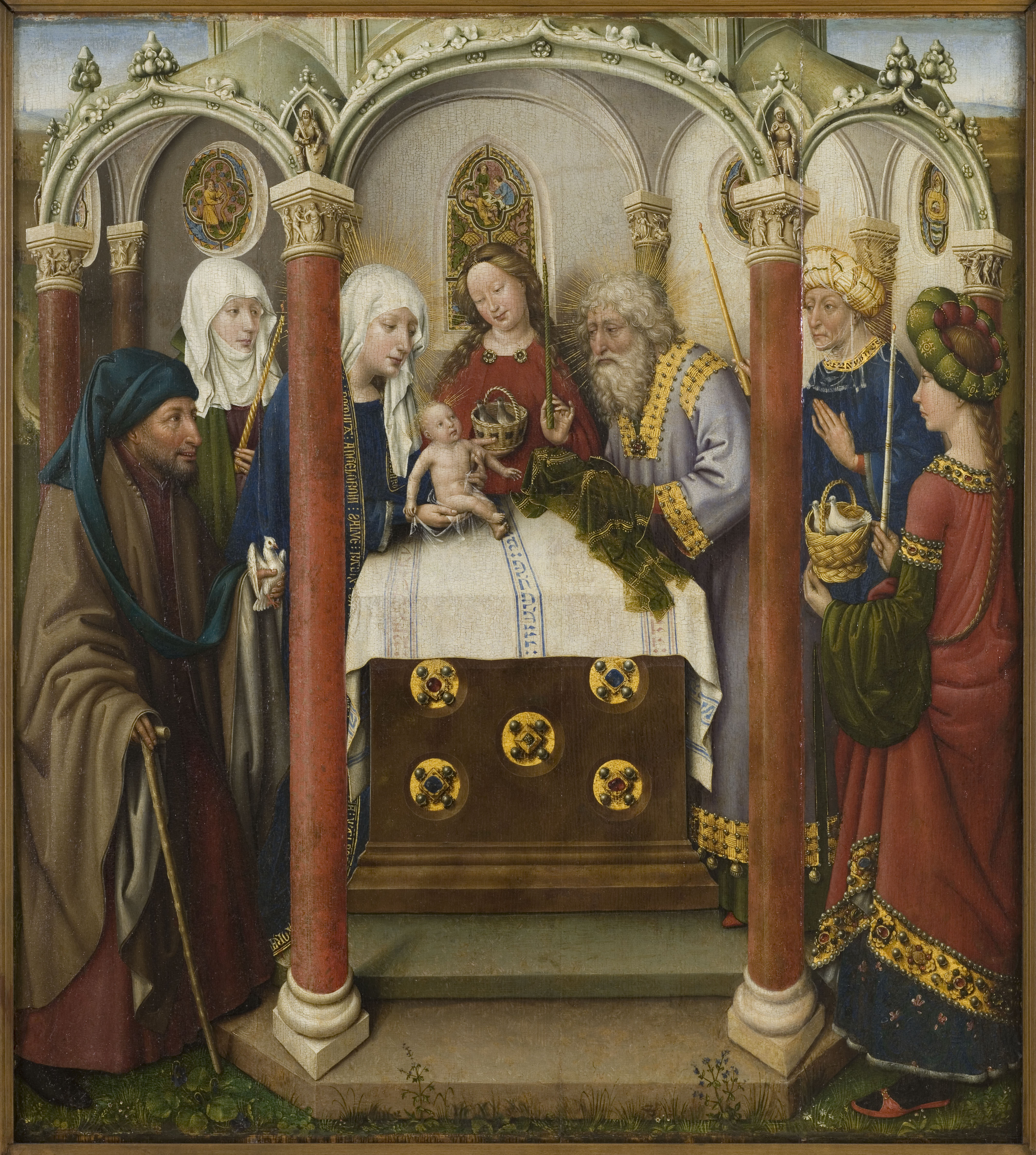
Presentation in the Temple, by Jacques Daret c. 1434
