= Nativity (Campin) =

Painting by Robert Campin

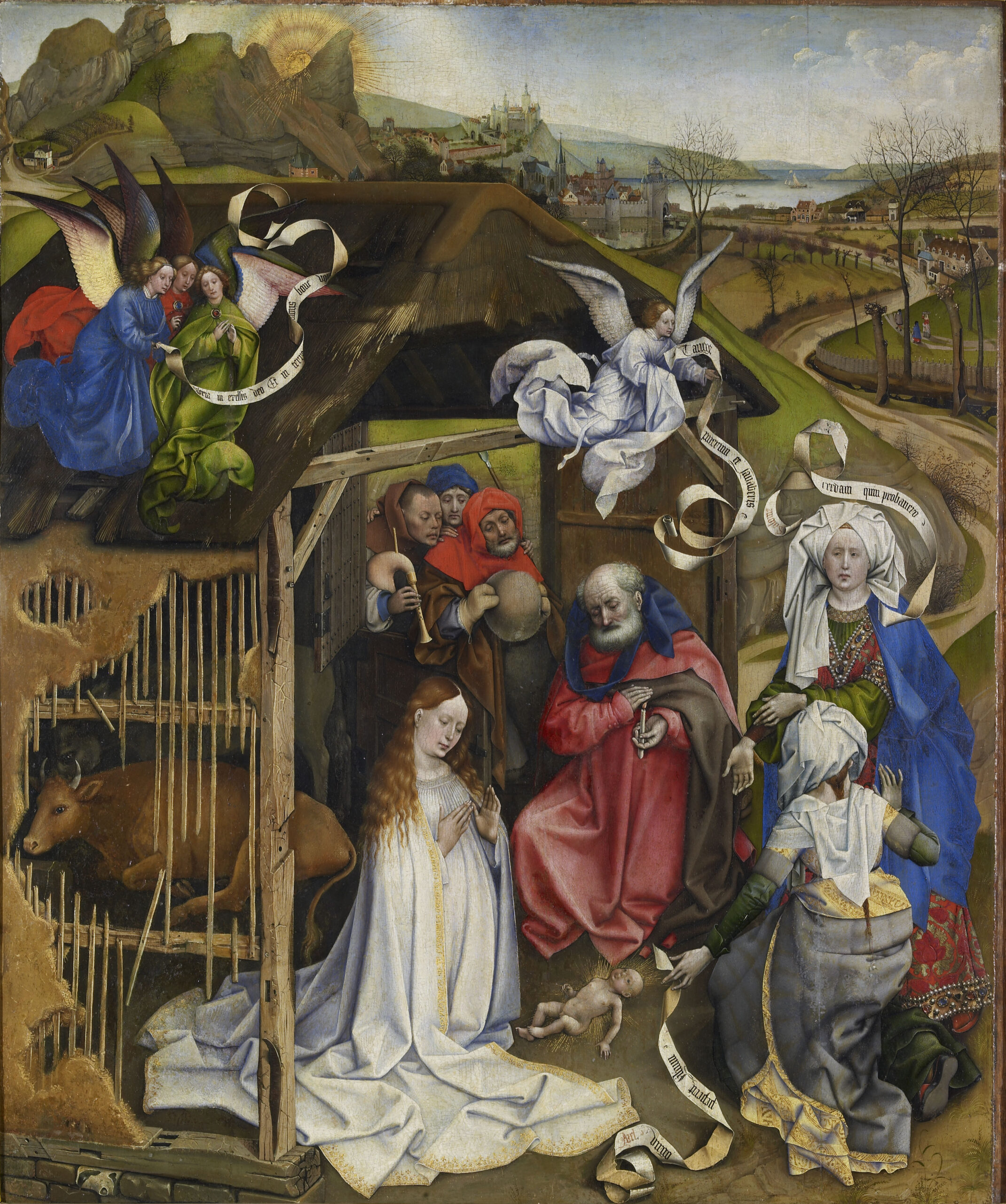
- Painting by Robert Campin
- Artist: Robert Campin
- Year: 1420
- Medium: Oil on panel
- Dimensions: 86 cm × 72 cm (34 in × 28 in)
- Location: Musée des Beaux-Arts de Dijon, Dijon
- Website: musees.dijon.fr/artworks/la-nativite/

Nativity is a panel painting of c. 1420 by the Early Netherlandish painter Robert Campin, now in the Musée des Beaux-Arts de Dijon, France. As often, the moment shown is the Adoration of the Shepherds. Harshly realistic, the Child Jesus and his parents are shown in poverty, the figures crowded in a small structure, with broken-down walls, and a thatched roof with a hole, the single space shared with animals. In this Campin abandons the traditional narrative.

The Virgin is presented as in her teens, Joseph as a much older man. Four angels hover above them, holding gifts. Two of them hold a scroll with lettering addressed to one of the midwives in the lower portion of the panel. It reads "Tangue puerum et sanabaris" (touch the child and you shall be healed), depicting the pseudepigraphical story of Salome, the doubting midwife, whose scroll here reads "I will believe only what I have touched." According to the Protevangelium of James, Salome extended her hand to ascertain whether Mary was a virgin, and her hand withered. The angels tell her to hold the Christ child instead, and her hand is healed.

From the little record of Campin, he was an innovator of painting, and here his appeal is to the poverty of the Holy Family. His knowledge of traditional composition is reflected in the positioning of the central figures in the extreme foreground, giving the panel a very tight and focused feel, despite the highly detailed background and landscape. The hut is slanted compared to the outline of the frame, a device later adopted by Rogier van der Weyden in his Bladelin Altarpiece.

Campin places a landscape complete with a view of a lake beyond of the stable, just above the two midwives. Reinforcing the idea of redemption, Salome is given a prominent position, facing outwards towards the viewer in the mid foreground.

== Sources ==
- Blum, Shirley Neilsen. "Early Netherlandish Triptychs: A Study in Patronage". Speculum, Volume 47, No. 2, April 1972
- Campbell, Lorne. Van der Weyden. London: Chaucer Press, 2004. ISBN 1-904449-24-7
- Rothstein, Bret. Sight and Spirituality in Early Netherlandish Painting. Cambridge University Press, 2005. ISBN 978-0-521-83278-6
