= Robert Campin =

French painter (c. 1375 – 1444)

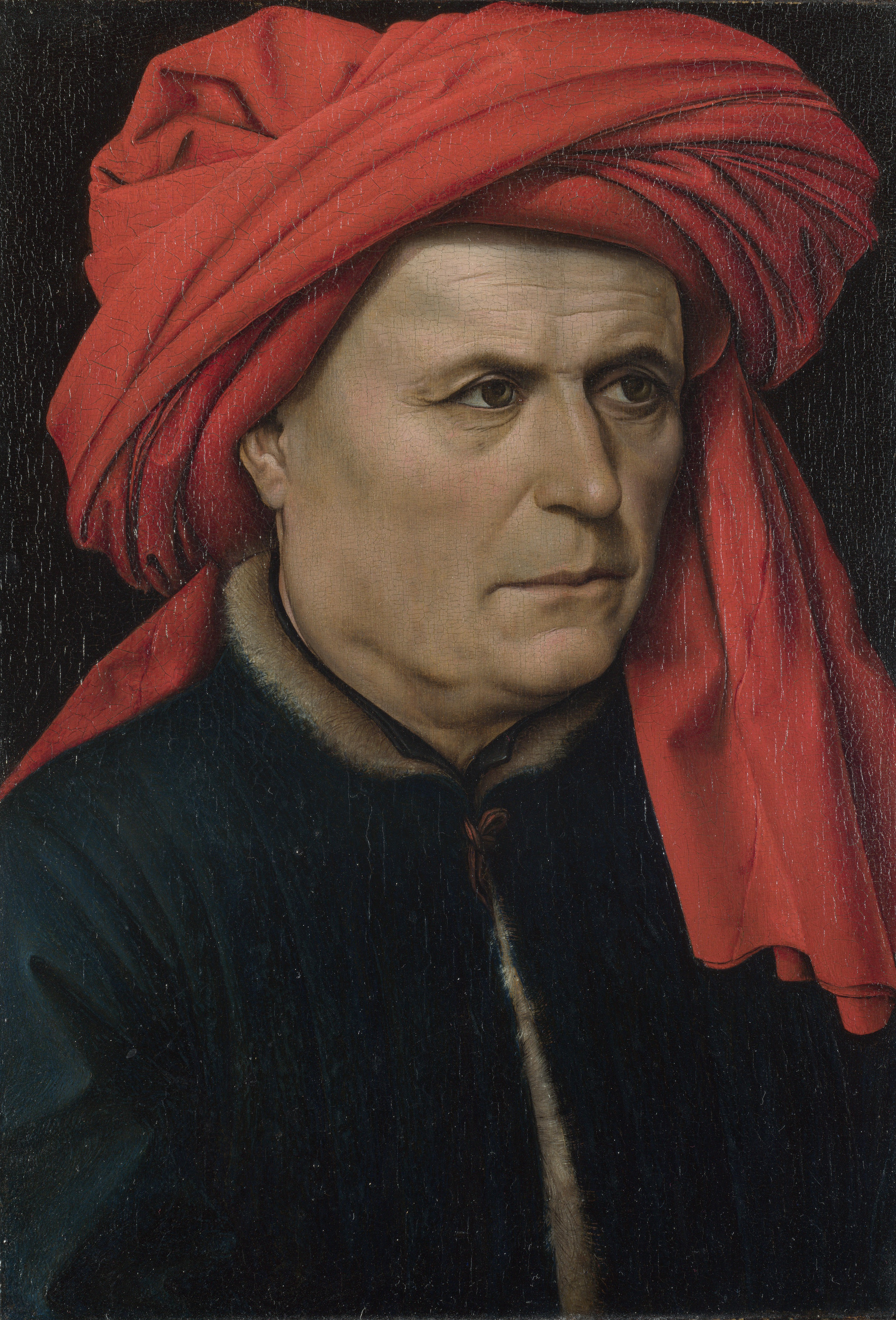
Portrait of a Man, c. 1435. 40.7cm x 28.1cm. National Gallery

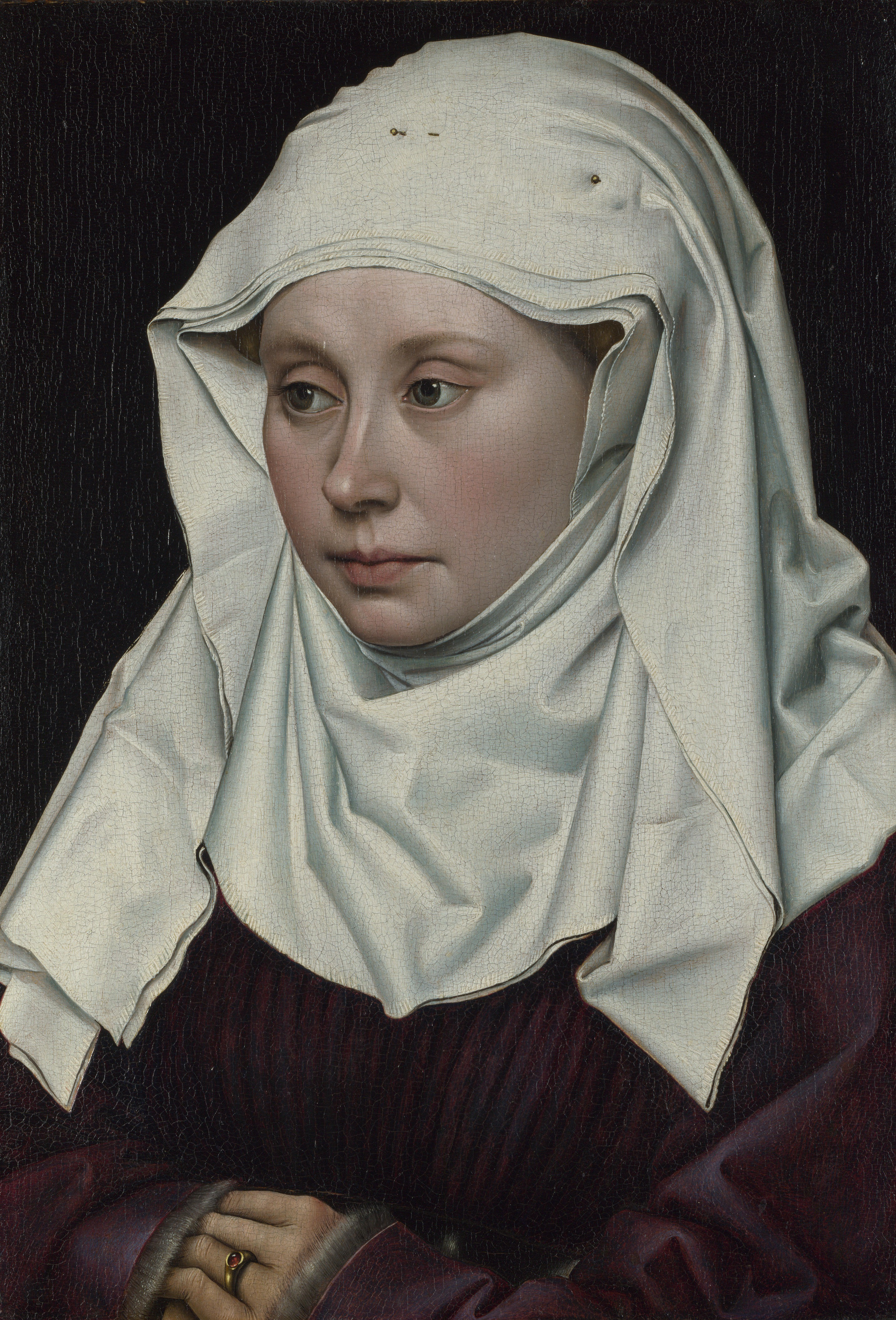
Portrait of a Woman, c. 1435. 40.6cm x 28.1cm. National Gallery

Robert Campin (c. 1378 – 26 April 1444), now usually identified with the Master of Flémalle (earlier the Master of the Merode Triptych before the discovery of three other similar panels), was a master painter who, along with Jan van Eyck, initiated the development of early Netherlandish painting, a key development in the early Northern Renaissance.

While the existence of a highly successful painter called Robert Campin is relatively well documented for the period, no works can be certainly identified as by him through a signature or contemporary documentation. A group of paintings, none dated, have been long attributed to him, and a further group were once attributed to an unknown "Master of Flémalle". It is now usually thought that both groupings are by Campin, but this has been a matter of some controversy for decades.

A corpus of work is attached to the unidentified "Master of Flémalle," so named in the 19th century after three religious panels said to have come from a monastery in Flémalle. They are each assumed to be wings of triptychs or polyptychs, and are the Virgin and Child with a Firescreen now in London, a panel fragment with the Thief on the Cross in Frankfurt, and the Brussels version of the Mérode Altarpiece.

Campin was active by 1406 as a master painter in Tournai, in today's Belgium, and became that city's leading painter for 30 years. He had attained citizenship by 1410. His fame had spread enough by 1419 that he led a large and profitable workshop. He had an extra-marital affair with a woman named Leurence Pol, which led to his imprisonment. Campin, however, was able to maintain his public standing and workshop until his death in 1444.

The early Campin panels show the influence of the International Gothic artists the Limbourg brothers (1385–1416) and Melchior Broederlam (c. 1350 – c.1409), but display a more realistic observation than any earlier artists, achieved through innovations in the use of oil paints. He was successful in his lifetime, and the recipient of a number of civic commissions. Campin taught both Rogier van der Weyden, named in these early records as Rogelet de la Pasture, a French version of his name) and Jacques Daret. Campin was a contemporary of Jan van Eyck, and they are recorded as meeting in 1427. Campin's best known work is the Mérode Altarpiece of c. 1425–28.

== Life ==
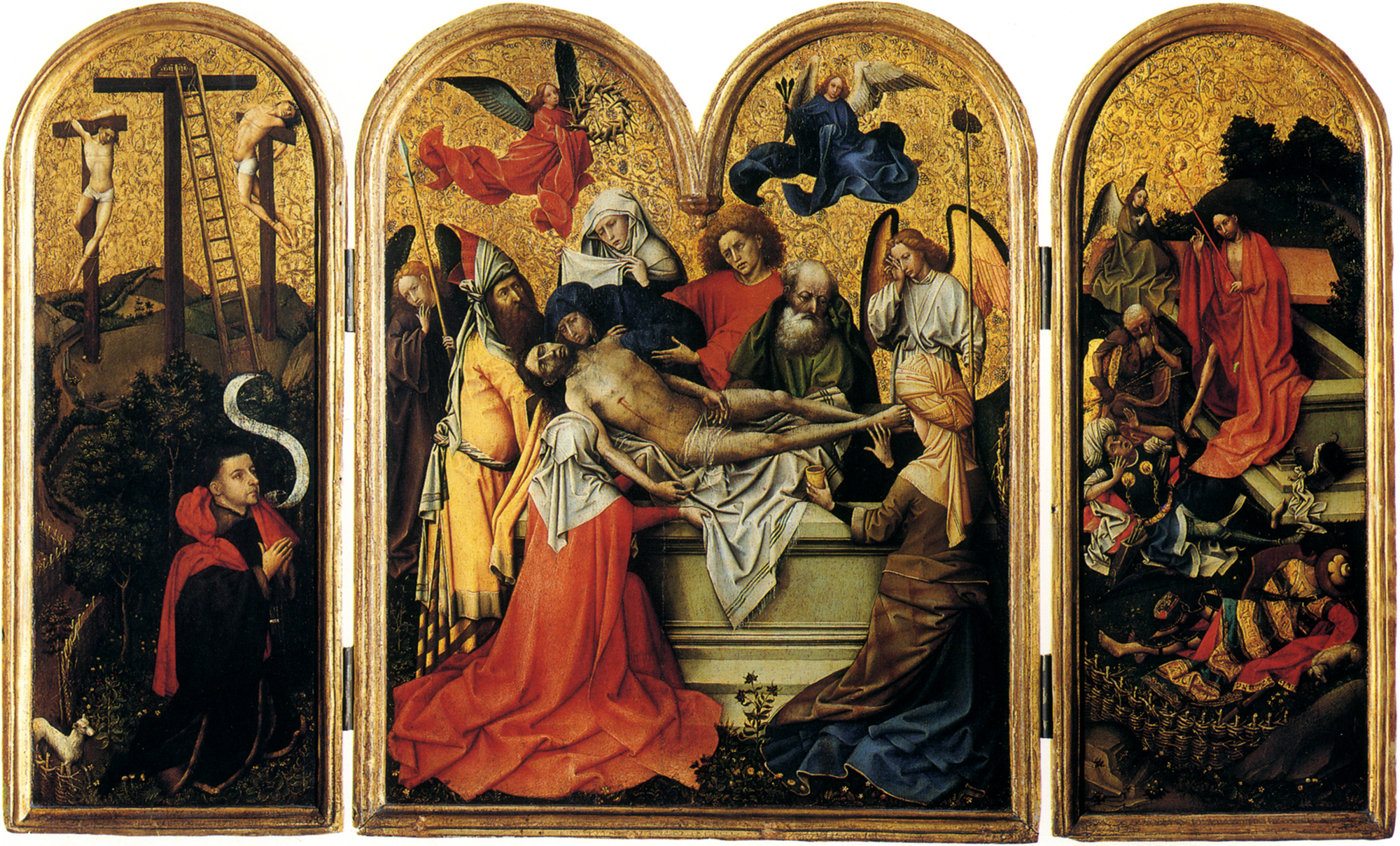
The Seilern Triptych, c. 1425. One of two of Campin's surviving triptychs. As an early work, it is highly innovative, especially in its application of oils, but less accomplished and successful (note the flat perspective) than his more mature panels.

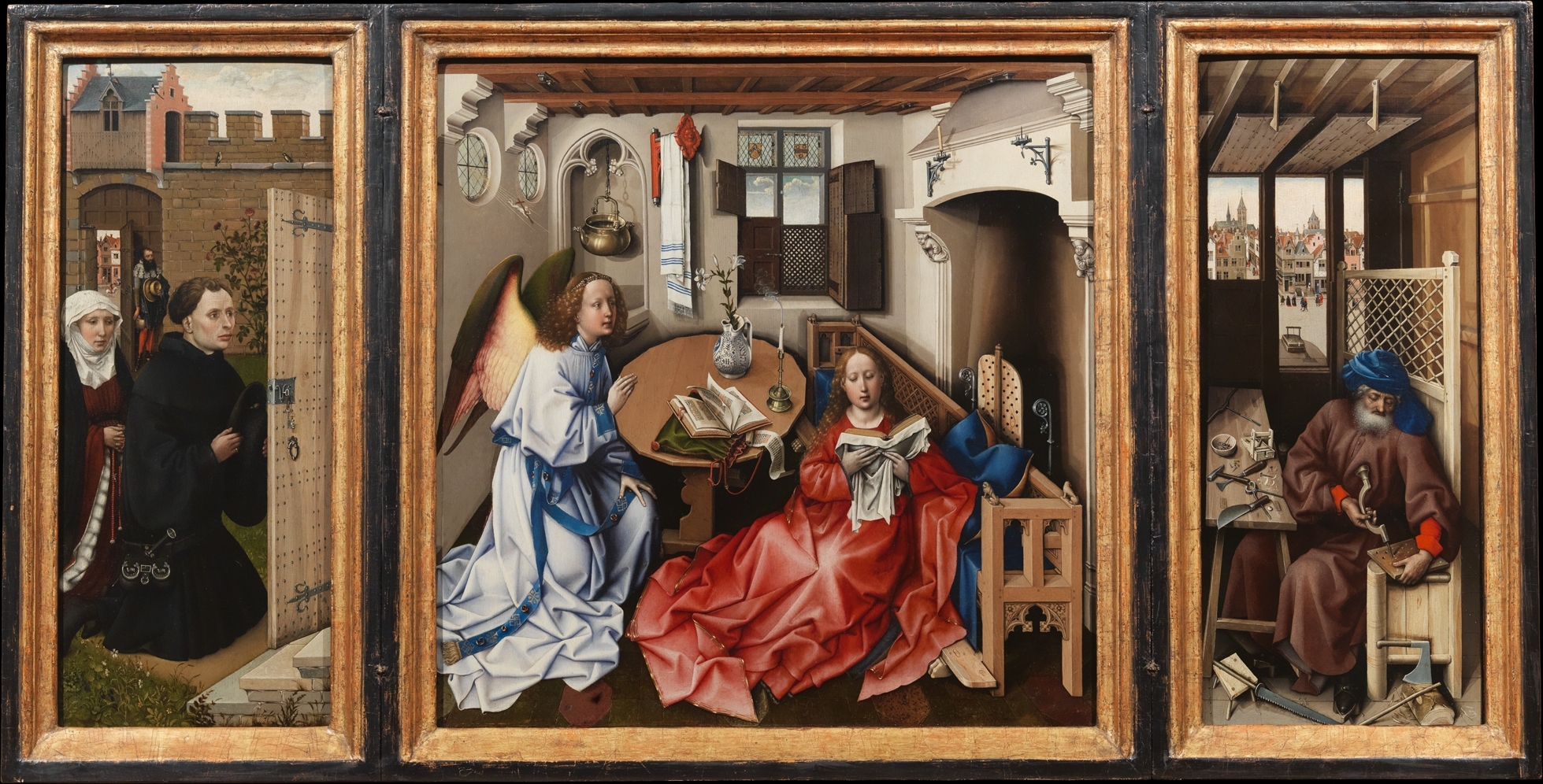
The Mérode Altarpiece, attributed to the Master of Flémalle or workshop, c. 1425–1428.

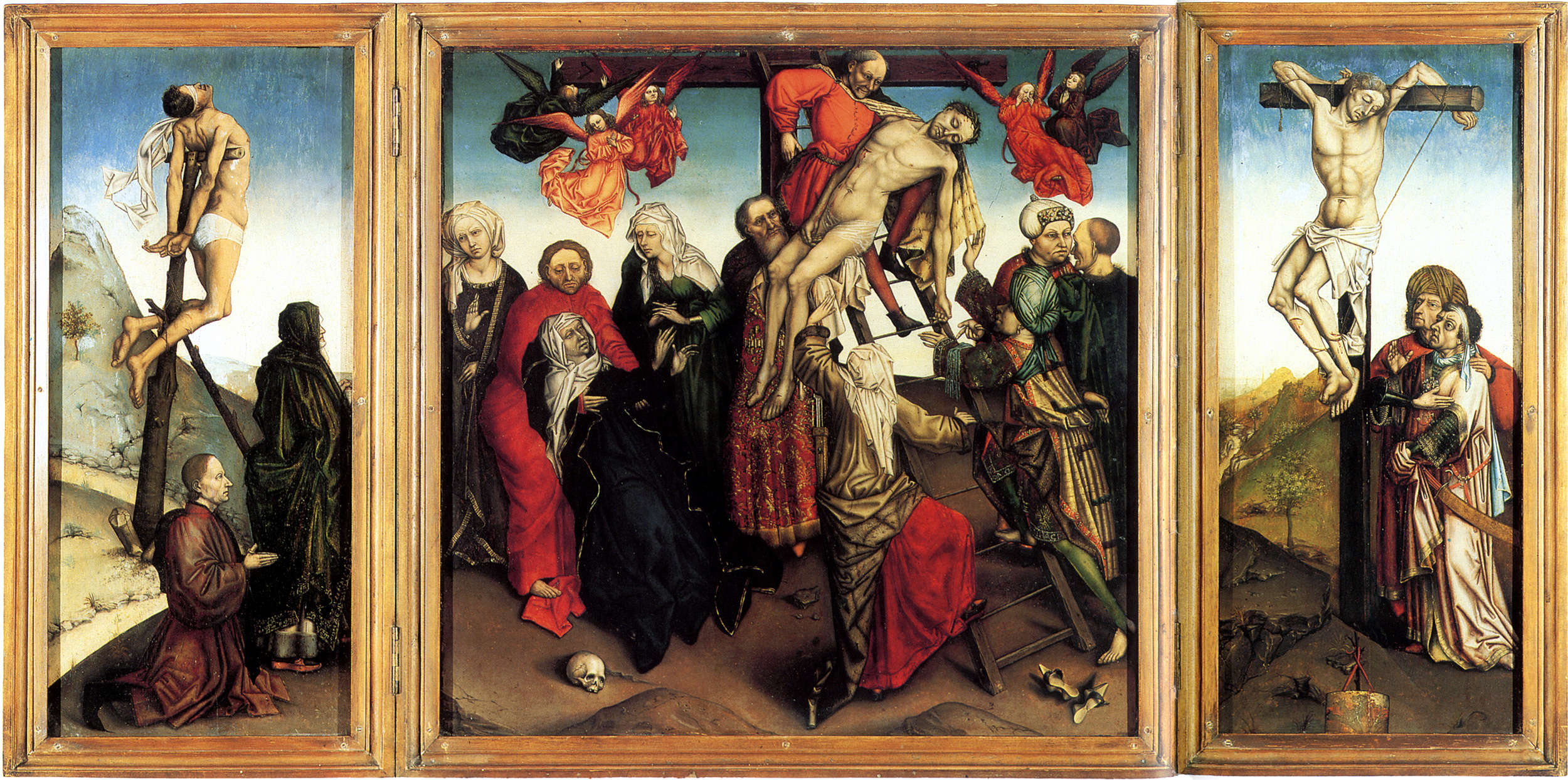
Descent from the Cross, probable workshop copy of a lost triptych.

Campin first appears as settled in Tournai from the archives of 1405–06, as a free master of the guild of goldsmiths and painters. There has been speculation about his origin and birthplace, although he is sometimes listed as having been born in Valenciennes. In 1408 he had purchased the house that he had been leasing since 1406 near the Tournai Cathedral. In 1410, he bought full citizenship. Records show a large number of commissions from individuals and guilds, as well as from ecclesiastical and civic authorities. Campin owned several houses, purchased city bonds and invested in mortgages.

Between 1423 and 1429, the city government was dominated by the guilds. Campin was the deputy dean of the guild of goldsmiths and painters in 1423–24 and 1425. In 1427 he represented the guild on the city council. Between 1426 and 1428, during his time at the guild, Campin employed four different apprentices Rogelet de le Pasture, Haquin de Blandain, Jaquelotte Daret, Willemet. After restoration of the oligarchy of full citizens, the leaders of the guild regime, including Robert Campin, were brought to court. Campin was ordered to make a pilgrimage to Saint-Gilles and pay the fine.

Campin was married to Ysabel de Stocquain (Elisabeth van Stokkem). The couple was childless. He had an affair with Laurence Polette, for which he was prosecuted in 1432 and sentenced to banishment for a year. Margaret of Burgundy, wife of the Count of Holland and sister of John the Fearless, Duke of Burgundy, intervened on his behalf, and the penalty was reduced to a fine. A short time after the verdict Campin's apprentices Rogier van der Weyden and Jacques Daret were accepted as masters into the guild of painters. However, the dated Werl Altarpiece (1438) shows he continued to work (the two outer wings are in the Prado but the main panel is lost). He died in his adopted city of Tournai in 1444.

== Identity and style ==
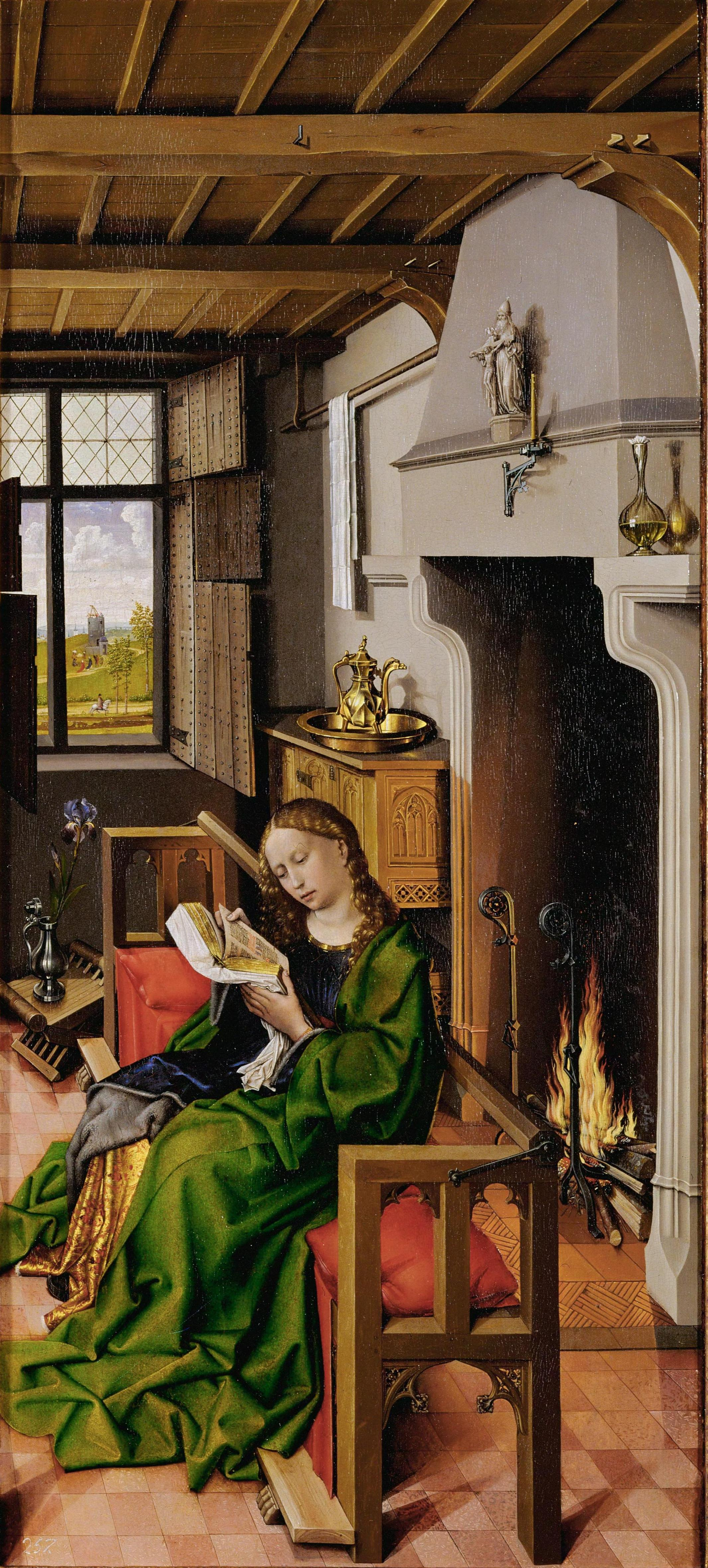
Right hand panel of the 1438 Werl Triptych, now in the Prado, Madrid

Although heavily indebted to late 14th-century manuscript illumination aesthetics, Campin displayed greater powers of realistic observation than any other painter before him. He was one of the first to experiment with the use of oil-based colours, in lieu of egg-based tempera, to achieve the brilliance of color typical for this period. Campin used the new technique to convey strong, rounded characters by modelling light and shade in compositions of complex perspectives.

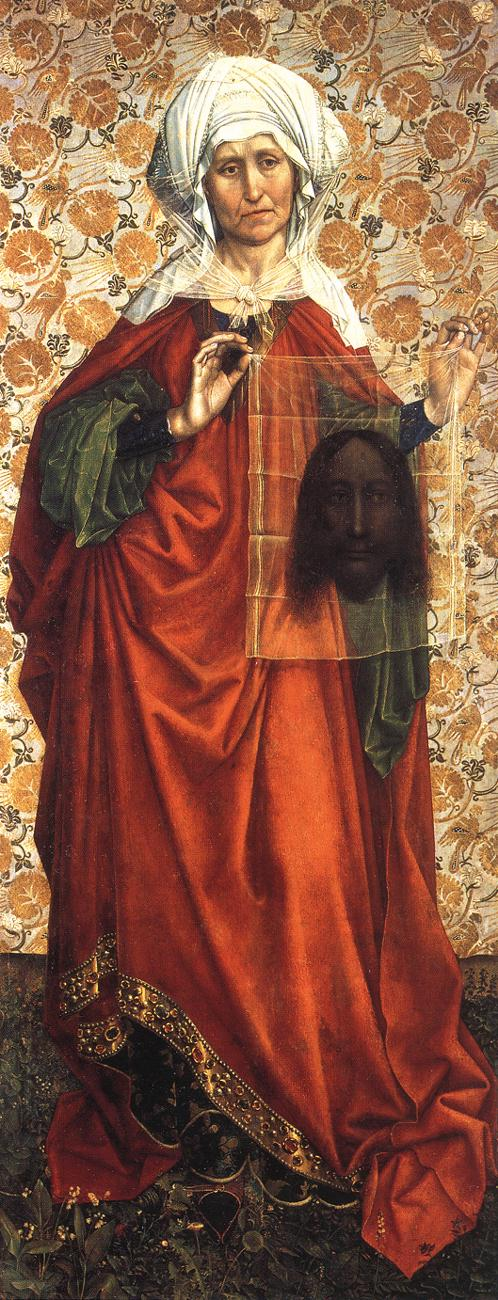
Portrait of St. Veronica, attributed to Robert Campin workshop

Art historians have long been keen to trace the beginnings of the Northern Renaissance – with far less evidence to go on than in Italy. For a long time it was thought that Jan van Eyck was the first painter to make full use of the innovations apparent in manuscript illumination in panel painting. By the end of the 19th century it became clear, however, that Van Eyck was the contemporary of an artist who painted a number of works, including the Mérode Altarpiece. Dated to about 1428, the altarpiece (now in the Cloisters of the Metropolitan Museum of Art) is permeated with loving attention to details and realism. Three other panels in a similar manner, supposed to come from the so-called abbey of Flémalle (it has been established that there was, in fact, no such abbey), are now in Frankfurt. It was argued that these works belong to one "Master of Flémalle", whose identity at that time could not be established.

In the 20th century, several scholars suggested that the Master of Flémalle may be Robert Campin, documented as a master painter in Tournai from 1406. The argument derives from a paper mentioning two pupils entering his studio in 1427 – Jacques Daret and Rogelet de la Pasture. The latter was probably Rogier van der Weyden. A very well-documented altarpiece by Daret shows striking similarities with the works of Master of Flémalle, as do early works by Rogier. Therefore, it is tempting to assume that both Daret and Rogier were disciples of the Master of Flémalle, i.e. Robert Campin. Another possibility, however, is that the Flémalle panels were painted by Rogier himself when he was still in his twenties. Some scholars have even attributed the famous Deposition in the Prado (Madrid) to Campin rather than Van der Weyden.

The tightest definition of the works from his own hand includes only the "Flémalle" panels, a 'Nativity at Dijon, a Crucified Thief (fragment of a Crucifixion) in Frankfurt, two portraits of a man and woman in London (of around 1430), and perhaps the Seilern Triptych. This, which excludes the best known works usually attributed to him, which are then assigned to his workshop or followers, is the position taken by Lorne Campbell.

== Work ==
The Entombment Triptych (or "Seilern Triptych" Courtauld Institute, London) is dated to around 1425. The central panel shows his debt to the sculpture of the time (Campin was known to have polychromed several statues). After this, he painted the Marriage of the Virgin (Museo del Prado, Madrid) and Nativity (Musée des Beaux-Arts de Dijon) around 1420–1425.

Around 1425–1428 Campin painted the Mérode Altarpiece, a triptych (three paneled paintings) commissioned for private use. The Annunciation occupies the central panel. The Archangel Gabriel is shown approaching Mary, who sits reading. She is depicted in a well-kept middle-class Flemish home. Several works attributed to Robert Campin may be seen in the Hermitage, including diptych panels depicting The Holy Trinity and The Virgin and Child. Other works are displayed in the Prado, and the London National Gallery. Campin also collaborated with other artists, e.g. with Jean Delemer in creating (presumably painting) two wooden sculptures of the Annunciation currently in the Church of Saint Quentin, Tournai.

== Selected works ==
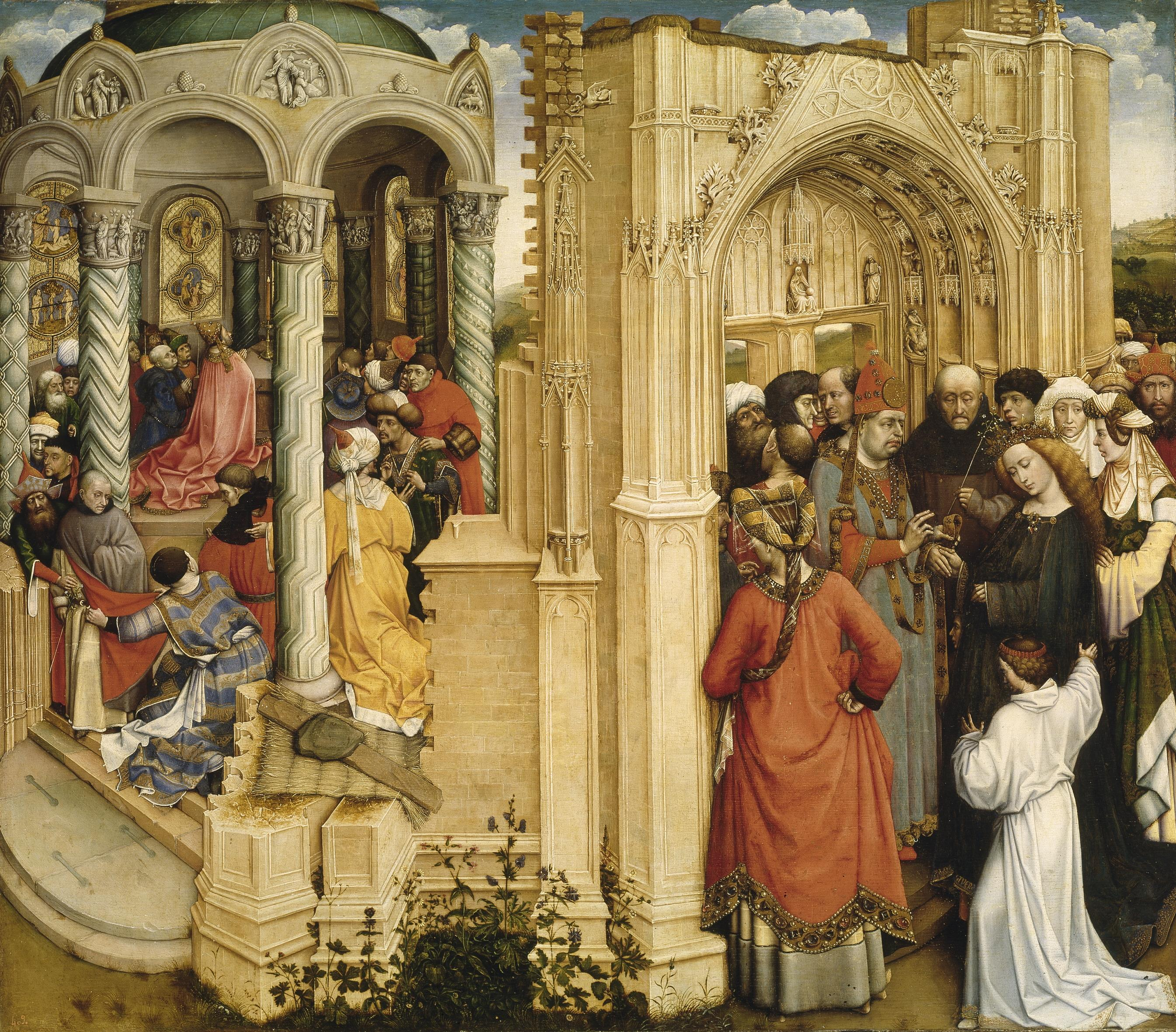
The Marriage of Mary, c 1420

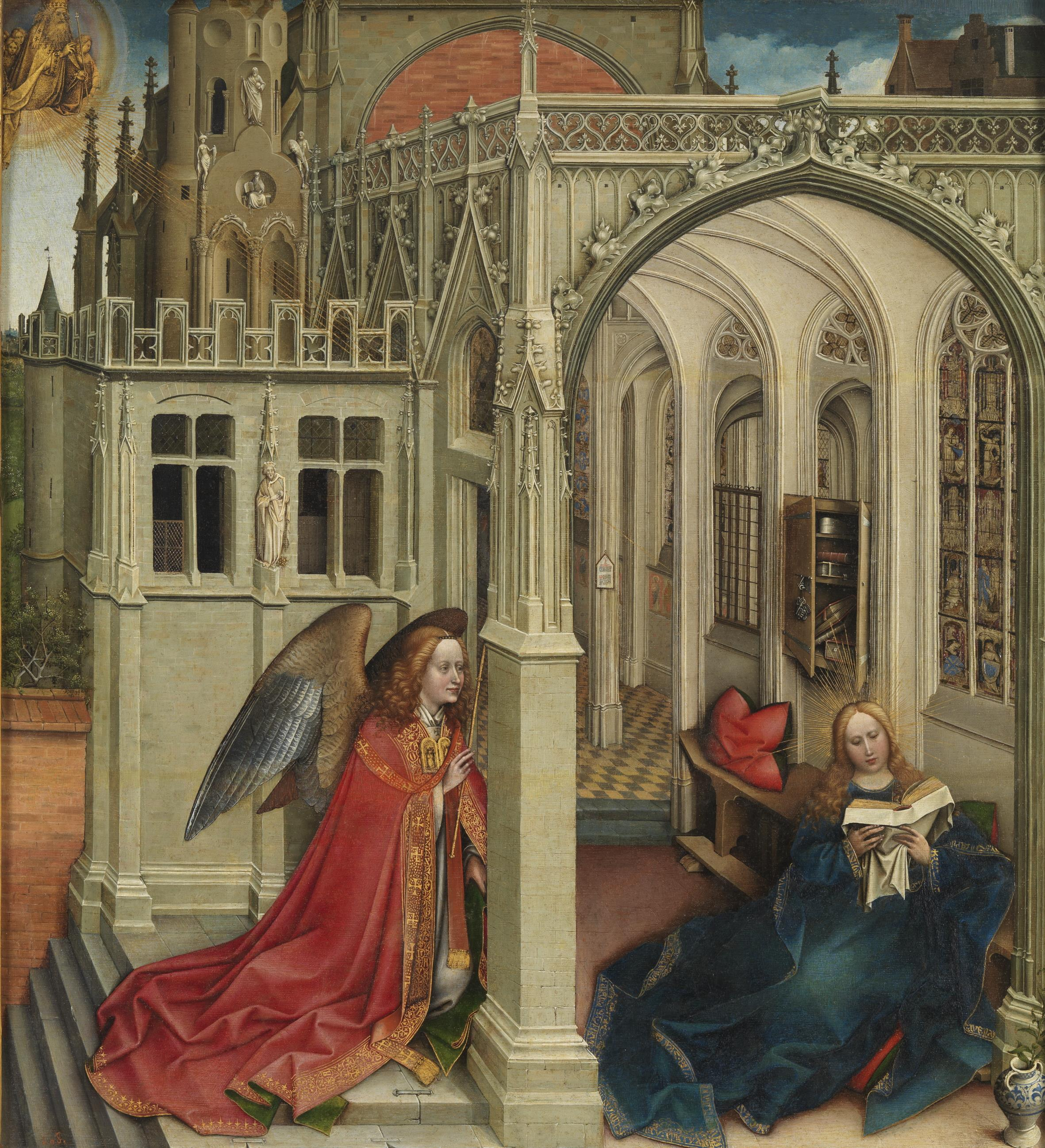
Annunciation, 1420–1425

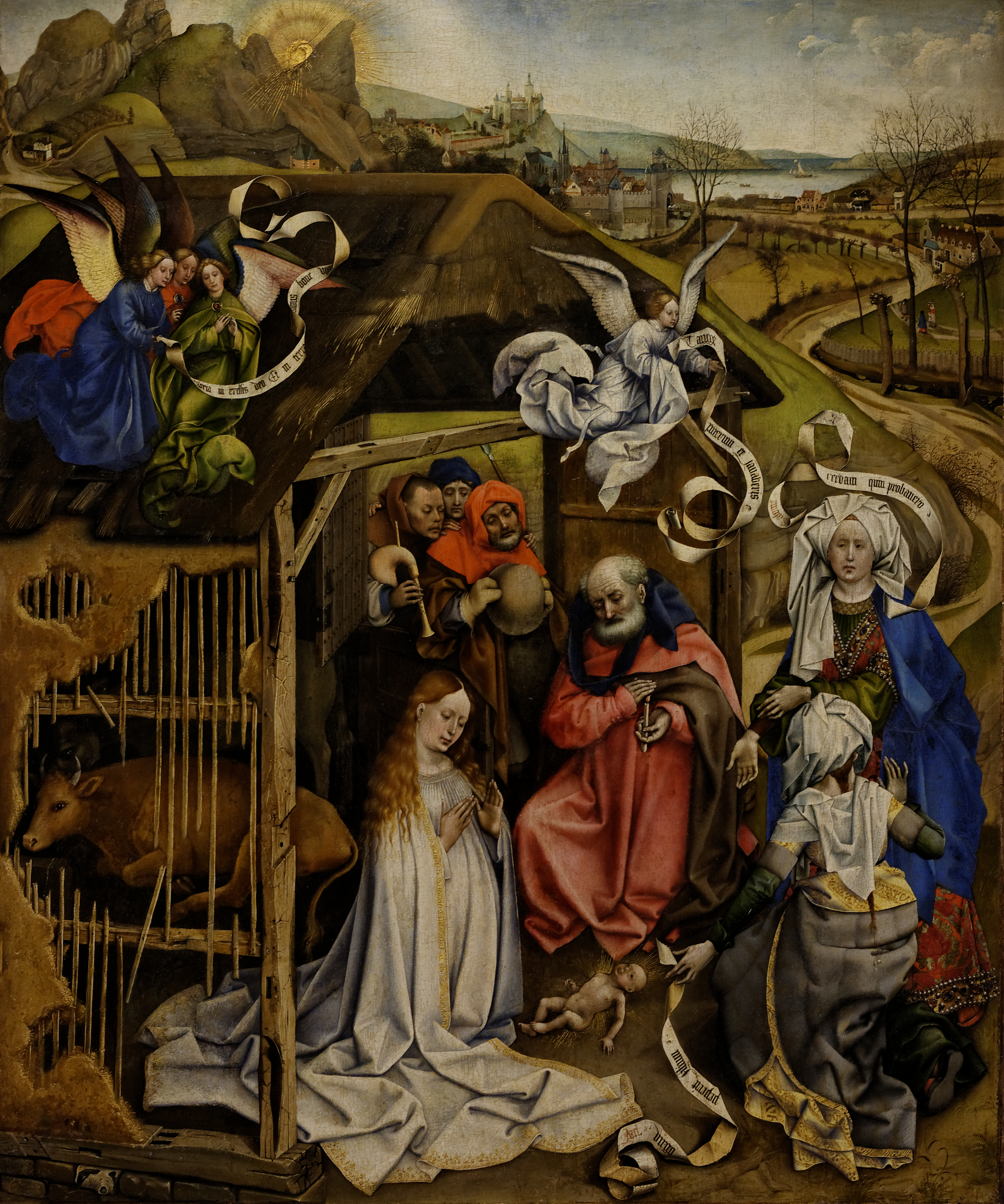
Nativity, c. 1420. Musée des Beaux-Arts de Dijon

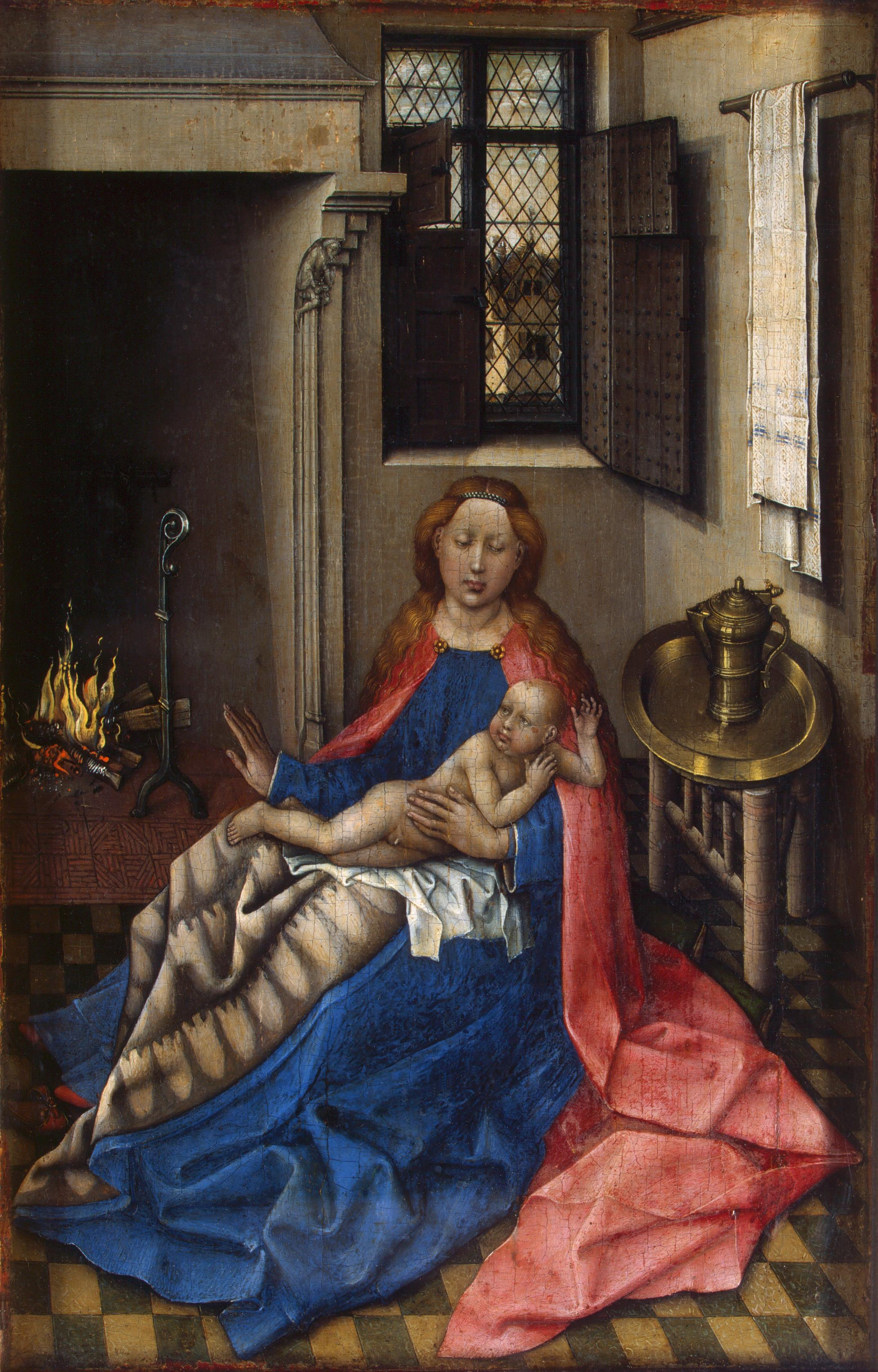
Virgin and Child, before 1430

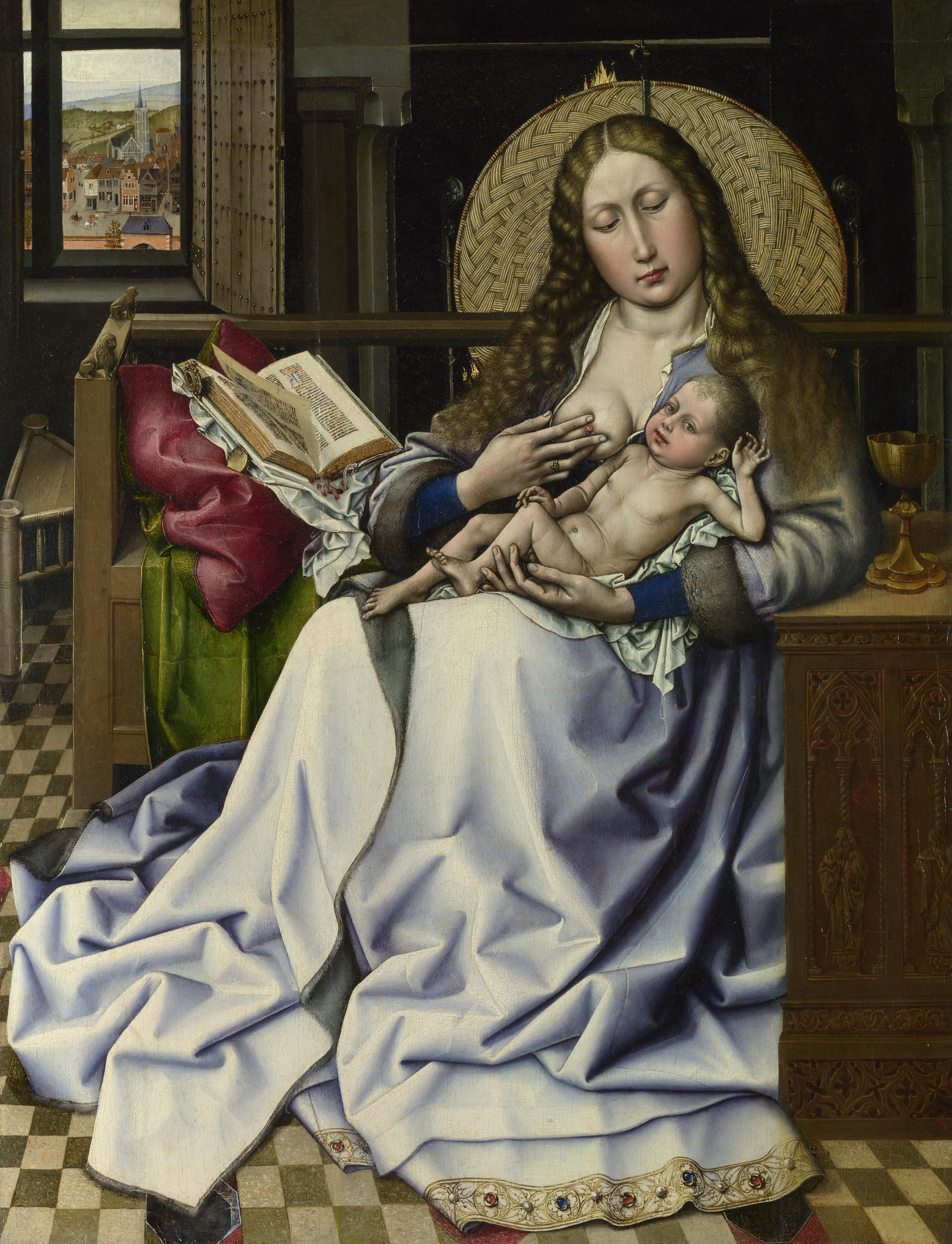
The Virgin and Child before a Firescreen, 1440

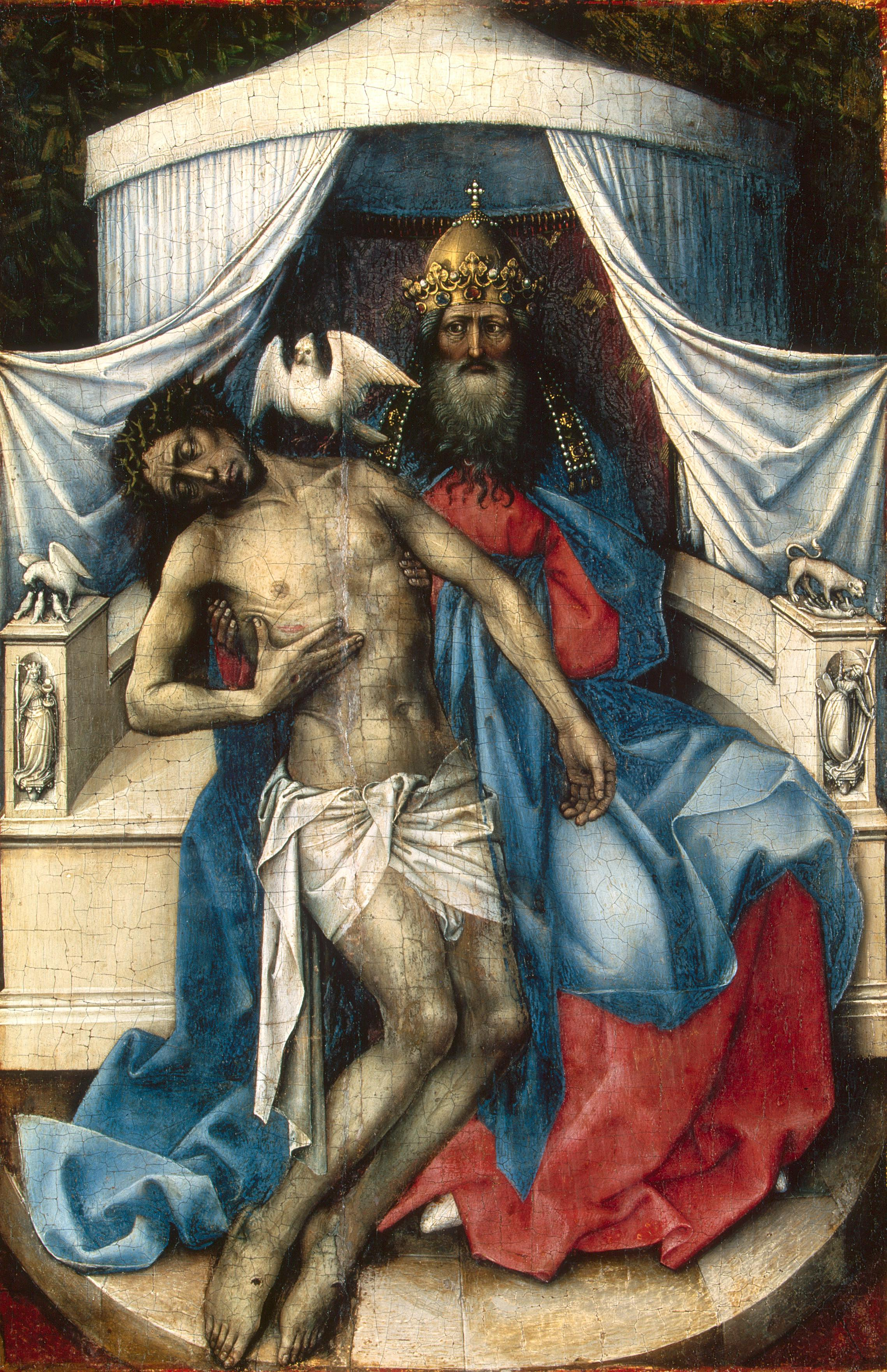
Holy Trinity, c. 1433–35

== Sources ==
- Campbell, Lorne. The Fifteenth Century Netherlandish Paintings. National Gallery, 1998. ISBN 978-1-85709-171-7
- Davies, Martin. "Netherlandish Primitives: Rogier van der Weyden and Robert Campin". The Burlington Magazine for Connoisseurs, volume 71, number 414, 1937. JSTOR 867164
- Foister, Susan; Nash, Susie. Robert Campin: new directions in scholarship. London: National Gallery, 1996
- Jacobs, Lynn. Opening Doors: The Early Netherlandish Triptych Reinterpreted. University Park, PA: Pennsylvania State University Press, 2011. ISBN 0-271-04840-9
- Hagopian, Annne. "Thoughts, Old and New, on the Sources of Early Netherlandish Painting". Simiolus: Netherlands Quarterly for the History of Art, volume 16, No. 2/3, 1986. JSTOR 3780631
- Thürlemann, Felix. Robert Campin: A Monographic Study with Critical Catalogue. Prestel, 2002. ISBN 978-3-7913-2778-5
