= Men and Women (newspaper supplement) =

Men and Women was a glossy supplement that goes free with the Sunday issue of The Times of India (the Sunday issue was also referred to as Sunday Times). It has now been discontinued and replaced by the current supplement Times Life.
