= Man and Wife =

Man and Wife may refer to:

- Man and Wife (novel), an 1870 novel by Wilkie Collins
- Man and Wife (1923 film), an American silent film
- Man and Wife (1970 film), an Italian comedy film
- Man and Wife, a 2003 novel by Tony Parsons
- Man and Wife, a 1976 poem by Robert Lowell
