= Tyrad Pictures =

American film production company

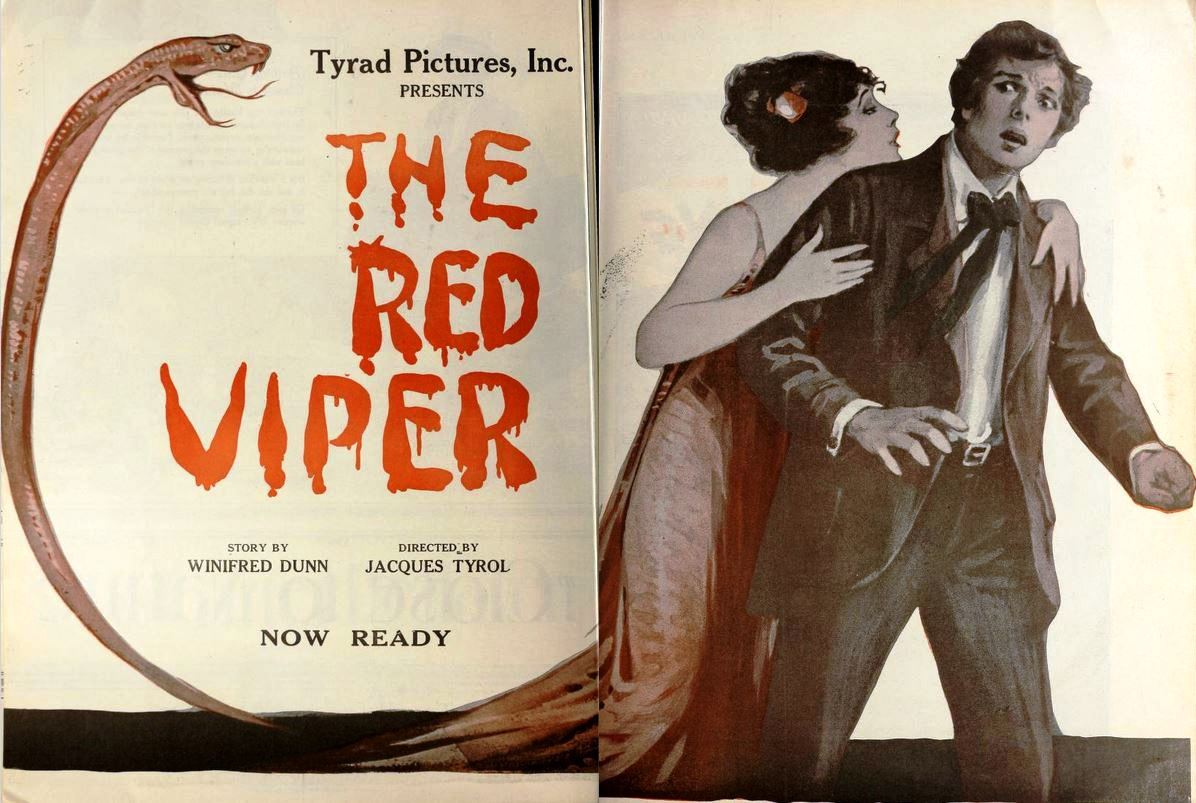
Advertisement for The Red Viper (1919)

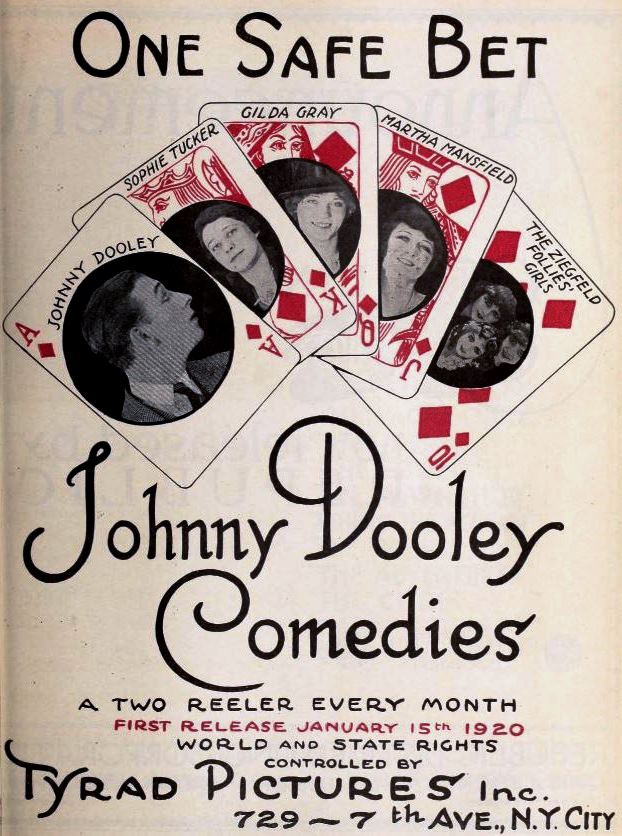
Advertisement for Johnny Dooley Comedies (1920)

Tyrad Pictures was a film production company in the United States during the silent film era. It was headquartered in New York City.

== Filmography ==
- Your Wife and Mine (1919)
- Man and Woman (1919)
- Human Passions (1919)
- It Happened in Paris (1919 film),
- The Red Viper (1919)
- Broken Hearts (1920)
