= A Man and A Woman (Campin) =

Two paintings by Campin

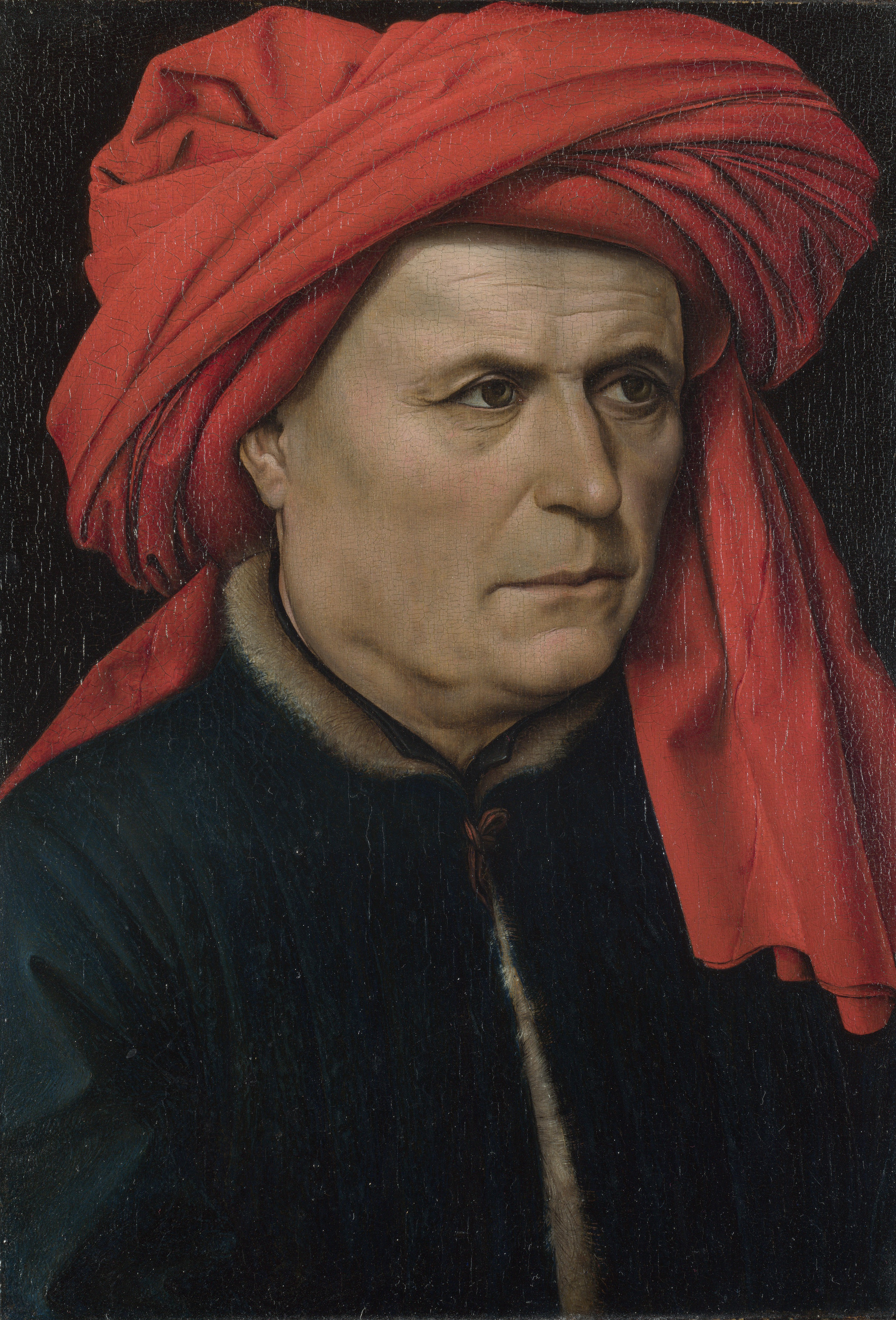
Portrait of a Man, c. 1435. 40.7cm x 28.1cm

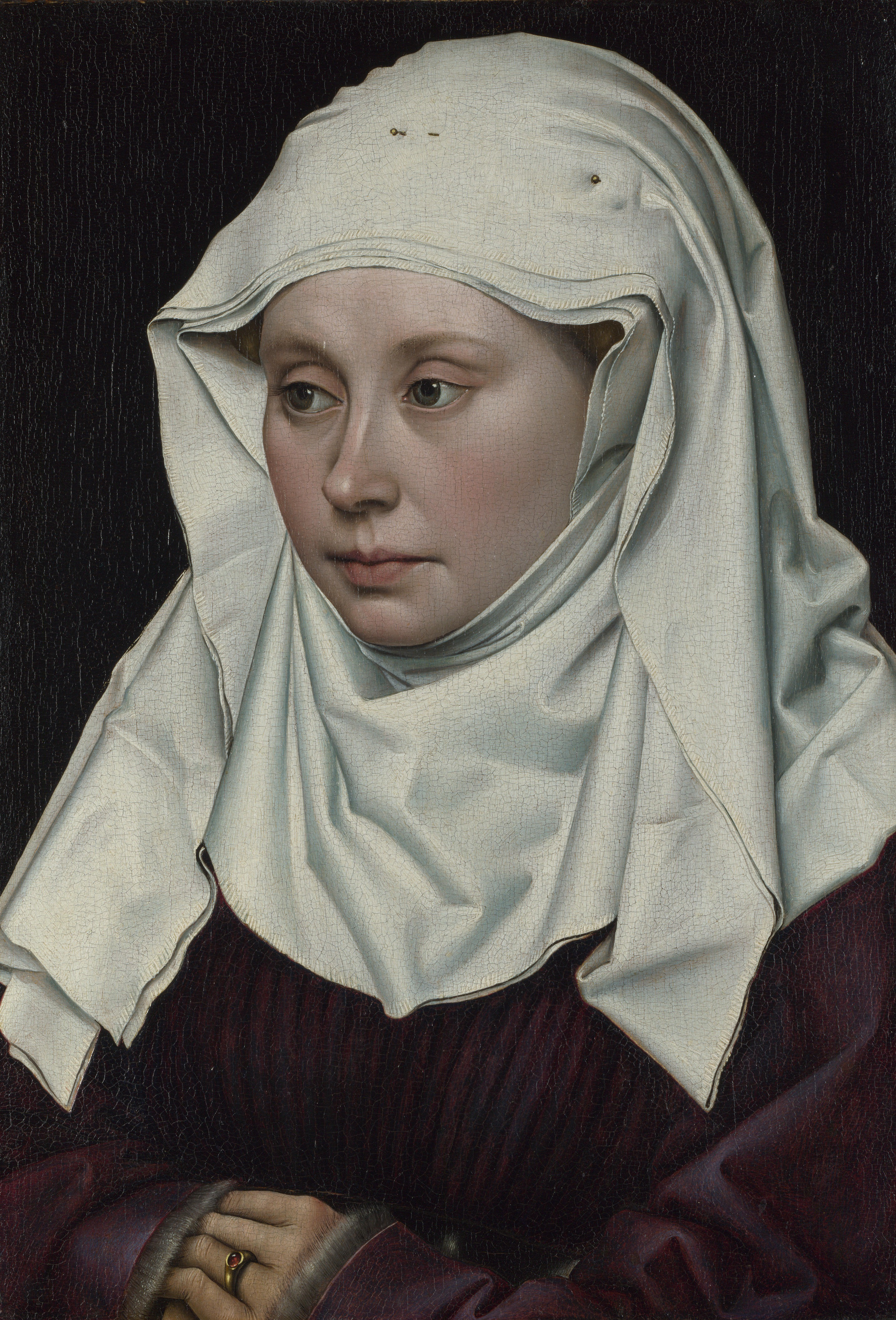
Portrait of a Woman, c. 1435. 40.6cm x 28.1cm

A Man and A Woman is the title sometimes used for a pair of oil and egg tempera on oak panel paintings attributed to the Early Netherlandish painter Robert Campin, completed c. 1435. Although usually considered pendants or companion pieces, they may also have been wings of a since-dismantled diptych. The latter theory is supported by the fact that the reverse of both panels are marbled, indicating that they were not intended to be hung against a wall.

There has been considerable speculation as to the middle-class sitters' identities. For a time in the early 19th century they were thought, on little evidence, to be of Quentin Matsys and his wife, later of Rogier van der Weyden and his wife. There is no historical record of the couple's identities, and no evidence (inscriptions, coats of arms, etc.) on the paintings themselves. Both were acquired in 1860 by the National Gallery, London, where they are hung side by side.

== Description ==
Jan van Eyck, Portrait of a Man (Self Portrait?), 1433. National Gallery, London

The portraits are very similar in a number of aspects, apart from their near identical size and form (each is made from two vertically grained and laid boards of oak). Both are portrayed in half-length, and set against solid black featureless backgrounds. The panels are very brightly and evenly lit, making the figures appear lifelike and three-dimensional. The framing is extremely tight and especially closely cropped around their heads, allowing the figures to dominate the pictorial space. As with many half-length portraits of the 1420–1430s, the heads are subtly large in proportion to the rest of their bodies. They are each composed from a very limited set of colours; the man's portrait is dominated by red, dark green and black, the woman's by white, brown and black colours.

The figures wear extravagant and large headdresses; his is a chaperon made from red fabric, hers consists of two to three wrapped linen veils. The chaperon consists of a padded bourrelet, a tightly wrapped Liripipe (a cornette in French), and a shoulder-cape (patte). There is a significant age difference between the two. The man has brown eyes and sagging eyelids, while her eyes are bright and blue.

== Attribution ==
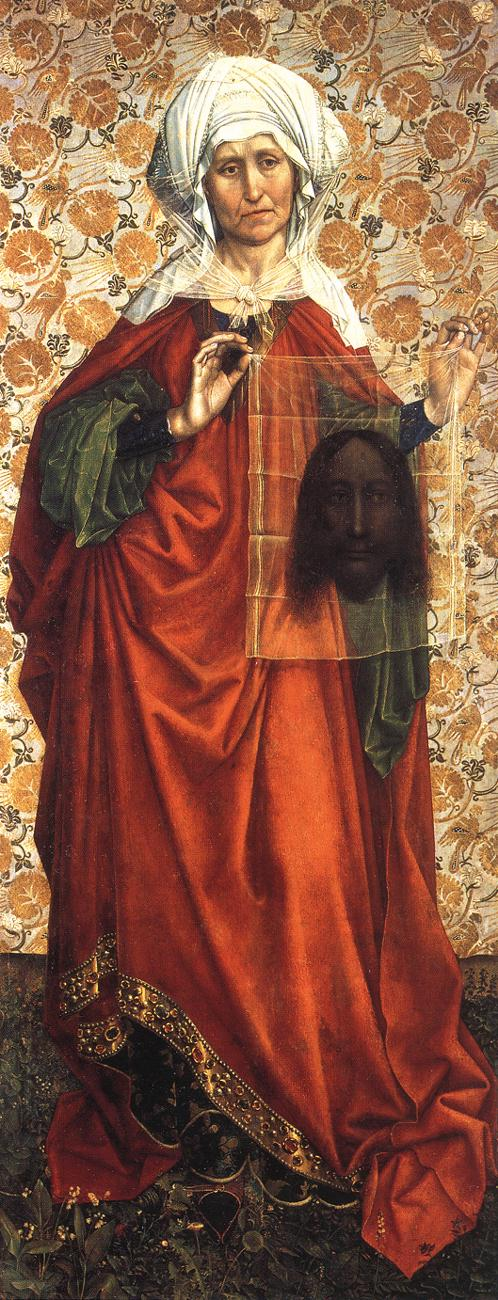
Portrait of St. Veronica, c. 1410, attributed to Robert Campin

Since their rediscovery in the early 19th century, the paintings have at times been attributed Quentin Matsys, and later to Jan van Eyck (given its similarity to his presumed self-portrait also in the National Gallery, but signed with a date of 1433, two years earlier). In an 1860 catalogue, they were attributed to "Rogier van der Weyden the Younger". Usually accepted as pendants of a married couple, in the cases of Matsys and van der Weyden, there was a presumption that the portraits were of that artist and their wife. The more recent and widely accepted attribution to Campin, who is usually identified as the Master of Flémalle, is based mainly on stylistic grounds. None of his documented works survive, nor is there any hint either of his identification, in the form of inscriptions, coats or arms, on the panels.

Art historian Lorne Campbell believes the male portrait is similar to the Flémalle Saint Veronica, while the woman is similar to a portrait of the Virgin in the same grouping. Campbell writes that with the man, "there is a similar sensitivity to the structure of the head and to the changing textures of the skin, especially in the areas of the mouths; a similar way of drawing the eyes and eye-sockets; and, in the Woman and the Child, a similar way of indicating the catch-lights of the eyes."

== Sources ==
- Bauman, Guy. "Early Flemish Portraits, 1425–1525". Metropolitan Museum of Art Bulletin, vol 43, no. 4, Spring, 1986
- Campbell, Lorne. The Fifteenth Century Netherlandish Paintings. London: National Gallery, 1998. ISBN 978-1-8570-9171-7
- Campbell, Lorne. "Robert Campin, the Master of Flémalle and the Master of Mérode". Burlington Magazine, volume 116, no. 860, November 1974
- Hand, John Oliver. Early Netherlandish Painting. Washington DC: National Gallery of Art, 1987. ISBN 978-0-8946-8093-9
- Jones, Susan Frances. From Van Eyck to Gossaert. London: National Gallery, 2011. ISBN 978-1-8570-9504-3
- Reuterswärd, Patrik. "New light on Robert Campin". Konsthistorisk tidskrift (Journal of Art History), 1998
