= Marriage of the Virgin (Campin) =

c. 1425 painting by Robert Campin

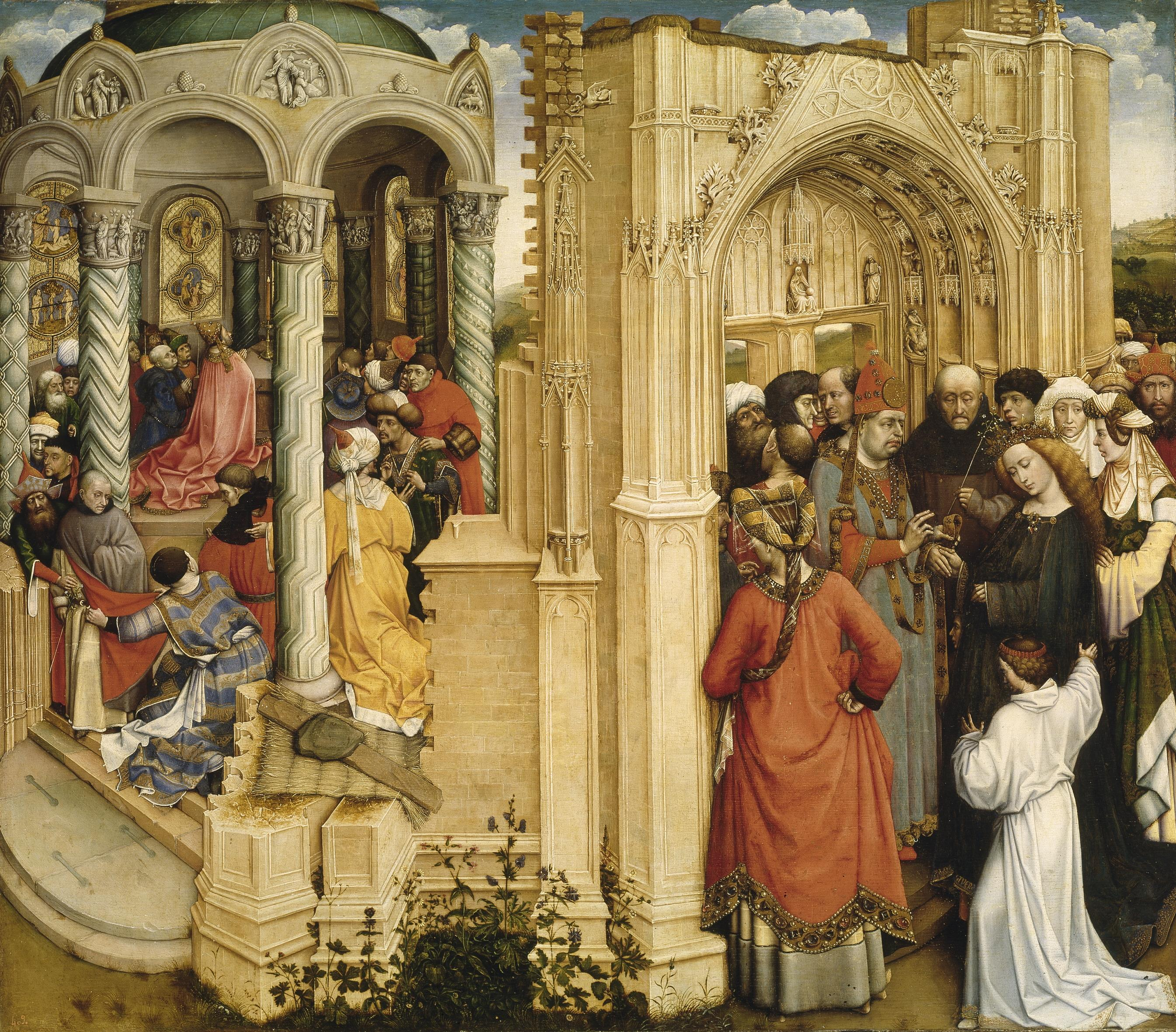
- Artist: Robert Campin
- Year: c. 1420–1430
- Medium: oil on panel
- Dimensions: 77 cm × 88 cm (30 in × 35 in)
- Location: Museo del Prado, Madrid

The Marriage of the Virgin, also known as The Betrothal of the Virgin, is a c. 1420–1430 oil on oak painting by the Early Netherlandish painter Robert Campin. The painting was intended to be a metaphor, primarily focused on the transition from the Old to the New Testament, which is expressed through iconography and disguised symbolism. It entered into the Spanish royal collection at El Escorial in 1584. It was later obtained by Prado Museum, where it continues to reside. This work by Robert Campin is one of his earliest and was previously attributed to Roger Van der Weyden.

The painting shows the betrothing of Mary and Joseph in front of an incomplete Gothic portal. In the left background, there is a Romanesque building that presents the Miracle of the Flowering Rod. This is the event in which Joseph was chosen to be wed to Mary. Presented at the top of the building are stained-glass windows which depict scenes from the Hebrew Bible thought to be Old Testament stories, such as Abraham's sacrifice of Isaac. Robert Campin's "Marriage of the Virgin" symbolically depicts the transition of Old Dispensation to the New Dispensation.

== History ==
The Marriage of the Virgin was one of Robert Campin's earliest works, but was attributed to Roger van der Weyden for a period of time. Weyden served in an apprenticeship in 1410–1420 in the workshop of Robert Campin. Because the figures of Saint Clare and Saint James the Elder were painted on the back in grisaille, in a sculptural manner. It was assumed that Roger Van der Weyden had created the painting and thus the work was accredited to him for a short time.

== Style ==
Campin worked in the International Gothic style. Gothic style is based on strict geometry and having optical and coloristic elements that are within architecture and paintings. This can be seen on the painting on the right side where there is an unfinished Gothic cathedral being constructed. The is a high degree of detail on the pillars with their sharp lines and pointed arches, compared to the rounded arches of the Romanesque architecture on the left side of the painting. Inside the Romanesque building, three stained-glass windows contain scenes from the Old Testament. Campin had learned how to paint Romanesque architecture by observing frescos with similar architectural structure.

The painting has a significant amount of Naturalism, as can be seen in facial expression of the figures. The lines and surface detail of the architecture and pillars are a primary focus for the painting as each line can clearly be seen on the architecture. The rich colors of the clothing are typical of the International Gothic style.

== Interpretation ==
The main story of the artwork, the betrothal of Joseph and the Virgin Mary, did not come from the Bible, but from apocryphal sources like the Golden Legend. There are also stained-glass windows in the painting's architecture depicting scenes from the Old Testament that were intended to signal the redemption of Christ. Erwin Panofsky believed that The Marriage of The Virgin was a story about redemption. The symbolism of the Gothic architecture on the right is related to the imminent arrival of the New Law under Jesus. On the left side, Campin depicts Joseph who is going to be betrothed to Mary, indicating that Jesus has not been born yet. This reinforces the message that the Romanesque architecture is symbolic for the Old Testament which represents a time where Judaism was widely practiced and followed. The newer Gothic architecture is a representation of the New Testament since the new law was of Christian belief.

Panofsky believed that the unfinished architecture was intended as a metaphor for the beginning of Christianity. He viewed the painting as a form of disguised symbolism since there are indications of hidden meanings that reside in the architecture and figures depicted.

== Iconography ==
Iconography that is presented in The Marriage of The Virgin is the Miracle of the Flowering Rod. According to Erwin Panofsky, the Old Disposition and the New are expressed by two structures, which are not accurate depictions of the buildings of which they draw inspiration from. For example, the domed building on the left may represent the Temple of Jerusalem. The Miracle of the Rod presents the high priest Abithar who is sacrificing in the Holy of Holies, the inner chamber of the sanctuary in the Jewish Temple. The setting for the holy couple is occurring in the entrance of a gothic doorway which is the only completed section of the building. The Marriage of The Virgin is a conscious effort of what is to be a contrast between "old" and "new" architecture. The Miracle of the Rod and the Betrothal of Joseph and Mary occur simultaneously. The Miracle of the Rod represents the state of law during time of Judaism. The Betrothal of Joseph and Mary signify the impending arrival of a new era. This era is a representation of Christianity and how it differs from Judaism.

== Provenance ==
The painting was first acquired and taken to El Escorial in San Lorenzo in 1577 to become a part of the royal collection. In 1839 the painting found its way to the Prado in Madrid, where it has remained since.

According to the art historian Stephan Kemperdick, the Marriage of the Virgin was "without a doubt" originally part of the same altarpiece with the Annunciation by Campin (also in the Prado), although he notes that this idea is not universally accepted.

== Gallery ==
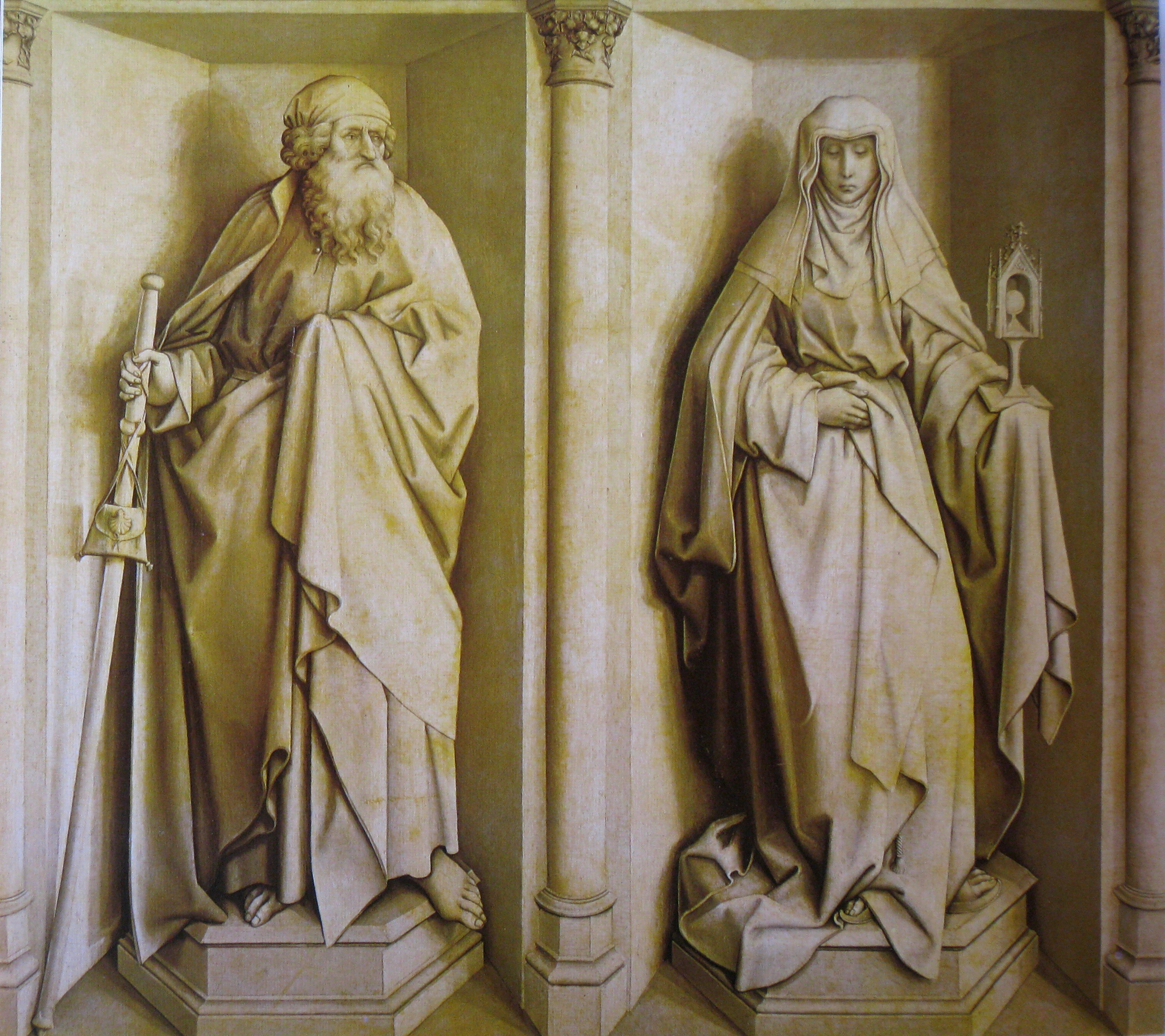
Saint James and Saint Clare (1427), Robert Campin, Prado. Reverse of Marriage

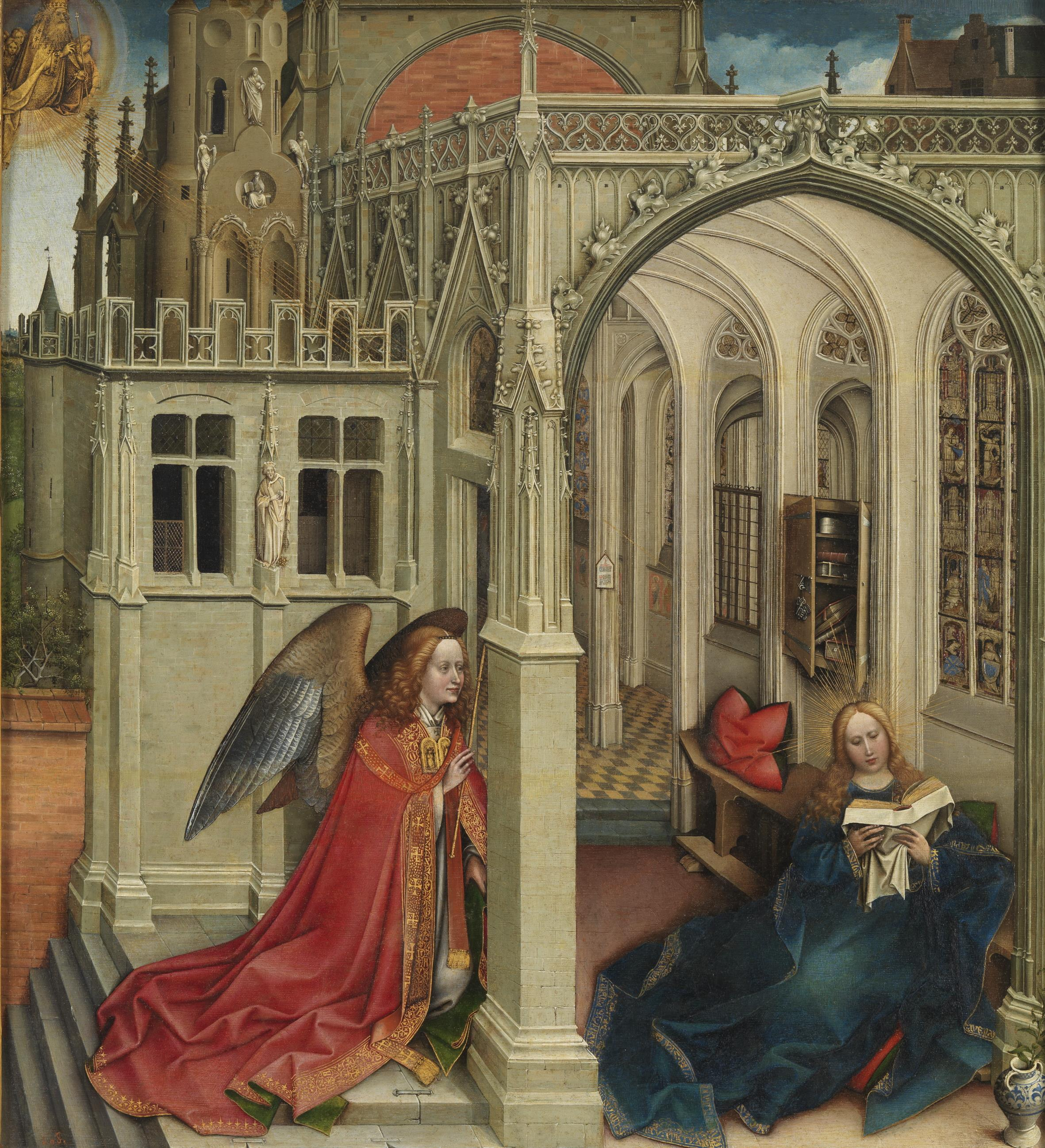
Annunciation (1420–1425), Robert Campin, Prado
