= Virgin and Child with Saints (van der Weyden) =

Altarpeice painting by Rogier van der Weyden

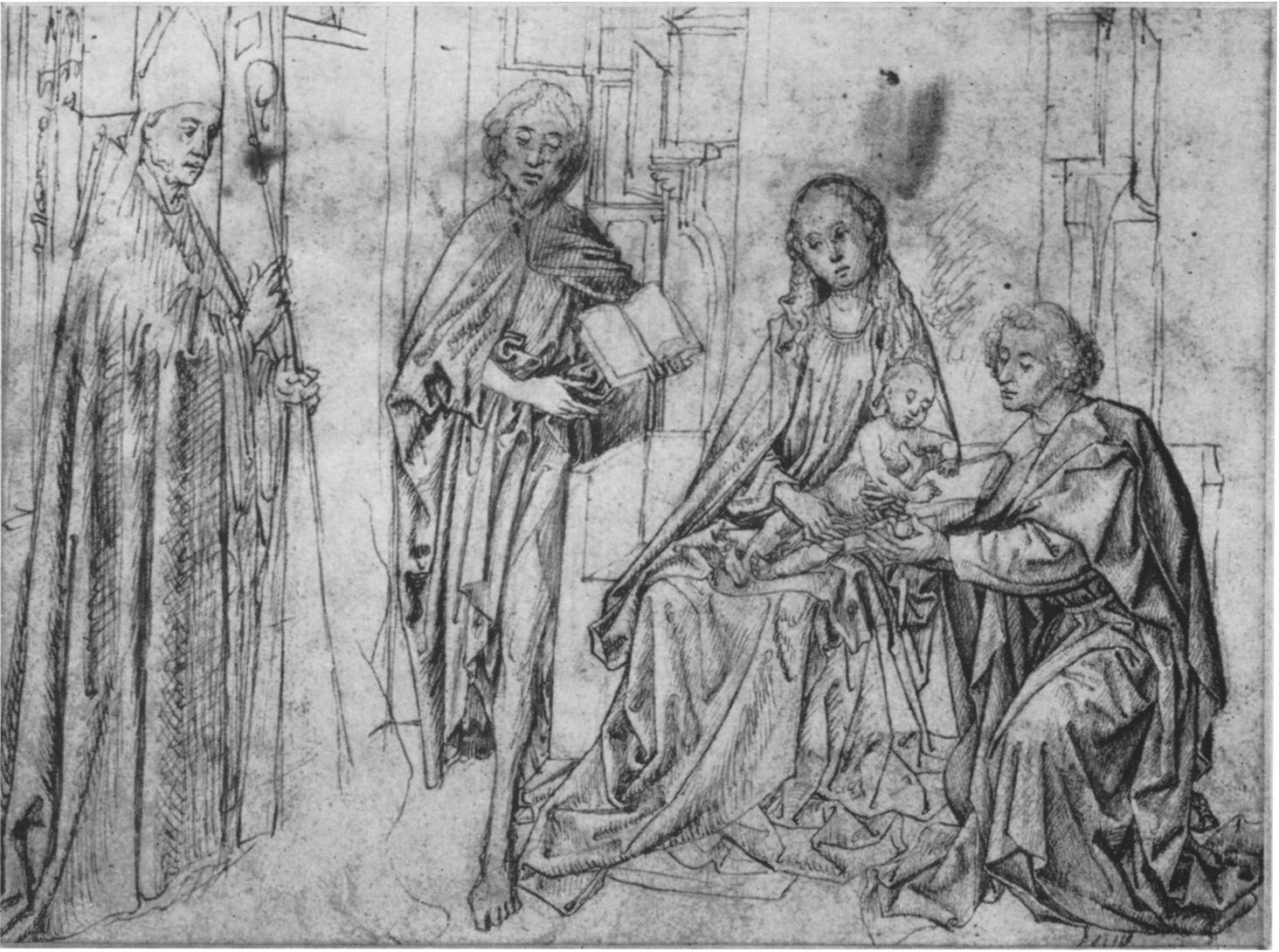
The Stockholm drawing, attributed to the Master of the Coburger Rundblätter, possibly shows a portion of the altarpiece. The kneeling figure to the far right is probably Saint John the Evangelist, some of whose red drapery can be seen in the London fragment. Mary's position on the lower right hand corner (out of view in this image) is guessed at by Ward from van der Weyden's positioning of similar figures in other works.

Virgin and Child with Saints, is a large mid-15th century oil-on-oak altarpiece by the early Netherlandish painter Rogier van der Weyden. The work is lost since at least the 17th century, known only through three surviving fragments and drawing of the full work in Stockholm's Nationalmuseum by a follower of van der Weyden. The drawing is sometimes attributed to the Master of the Drapery Studies.

The drawing has a loosely sketched background and shows, from left to right: an unidentified bishop saint with mitre and crosier making a blessing gesture; a narrow gap with a few wavy vertical lines suggesting a start at the outline of a further kneeling figure; a barefoot bearded figure in a rough robe identified as Saint John the Baptist; a seated Virgin holding on her lap the Christ-child who leans to the right, looking at a book; and holding the book, a kneeling beardless male identified as John the Evangelist. The drawing stops at the end of John's robe, at about the point on the London panel where Joseph's walking stick meets John and the Magdalen's robes. This suggests that the Magdalen panel was the first to be cut from the larger work.

The altarpiece's date is uncertain but believed to be between 1435 and 1438. Van der Weyden was made painter to the city of Brussels in 1435, and it is believed to have been painted after this appointment. The National Gallery gives "before 1438". Art historian John Ward notes that the altarpiece was one of van der Weyden's first masterpieces, created early in his career when he was still heavily influenced by Robert Campin. He proposes a c. 1437 date based on similarities to Campin's Werl Altarpiece.

== Remnants ==
=== Fragments ===
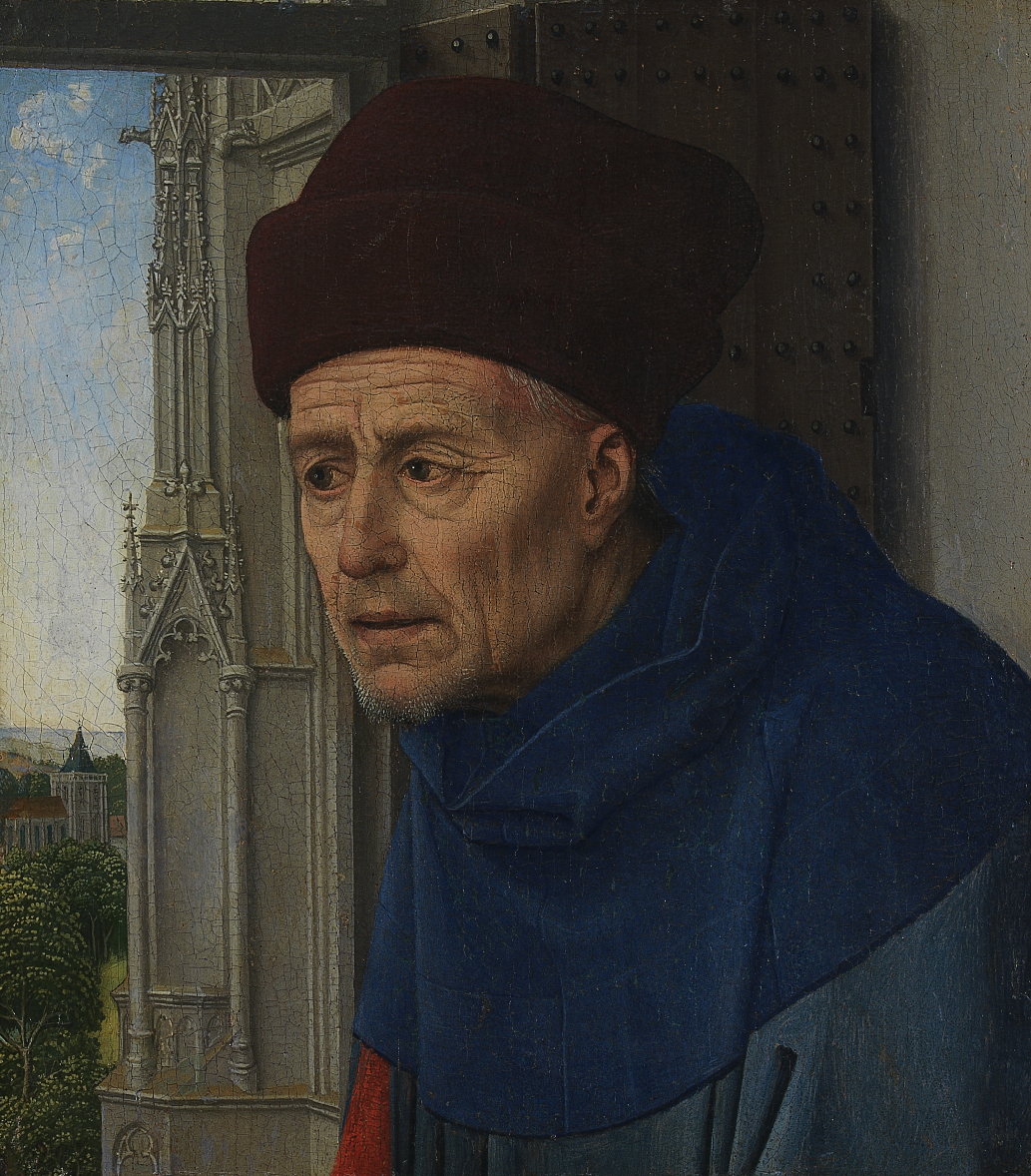
Head of Saint Joseph (fragment). 21 cm × 18 cm (8.3 in × 7.1 in). Museu Calouste Gulbenkian, Lisbon. This panel is thought to show Saint Joseph, whose body is visible to his upper arm in The Magdalen Reading.

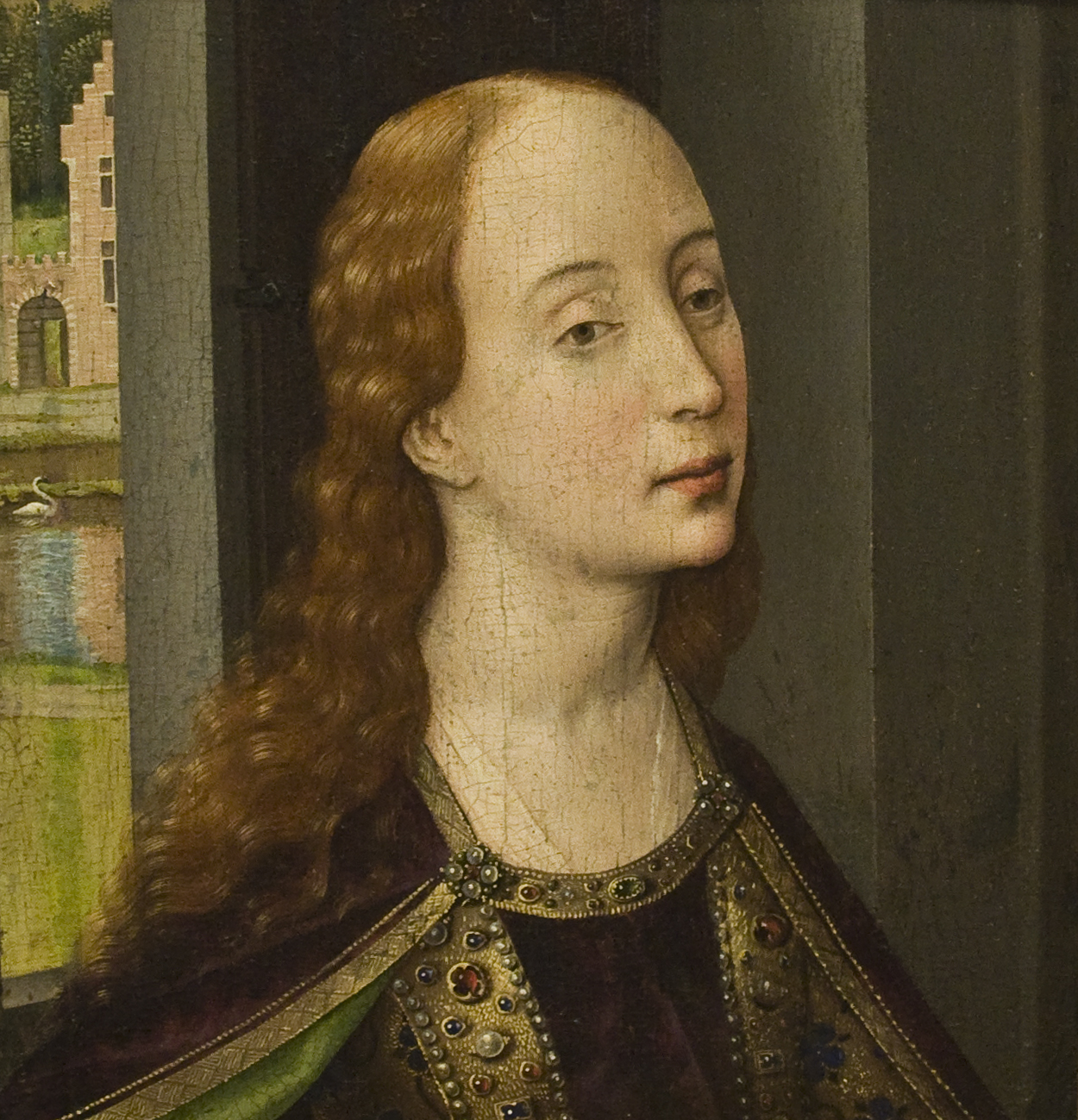
Head of a Female Saint (Saint Catherine?) (fragment). 21 cm × 18 cm (8.3 in × 7.1 in). Museu Calouste Gulbenkian, Lisbon. A possible representation of Saint Catherine of Alexandria, it is of lower quality than the other two known fragments, indicating that it was probably completed by members of van der Weyden's workshop.

At an unknown point before 1811, the original altarpiece was broken into at least three pieces, possibly due to damage, although the Magdalen fragment is in good condition. The black overpaint was likely added after the early 17th century when Netherlandish painting had fallen from favour and was unfashionable. Campbell believes that after the removal of the background detail "it looked sufficiently like a genre piece to hang in a well-known collection of Dutch seventeenth-century paintings". From the size of three surviving panels in relation to the drawing, it is estimated that the original was at least 1 m high by 1.5 m wide; the bishop and Magdalen seem to clearly mark the horizontal extremities, but the extent of the picture above and below the surviving elements and the drawing cannot be judged. Such a size is comparable with smaller altarpieces of the period. The background was overpainted with a thick layer of black/brown pigment until it was cleaned in 1955; it was only after the layer's removal that it was linked to the upper body and head of Joseph from the Lisbon piece. These two works were not recorded in inventory until 1907, when they appear in the collection of Léo Lardus in Suresnes, France.

The London panel shows much of the clothing of two other figures from the original altarpiece. To the left of the Magdalen is the red robe of what appears to be a kneeling figure. The figure and robe, and less precisely the background, match a kneeling Saint John the Evangelist. Behind the Magdalen is a standing figure in blue and red robes, with linear rosary beads in one hand and a walking stick in the other. A panel at the Museu Calouste Gulbenkian in Lisbon shows the head of a figure believed to be the Saint Joseph; the background and clothes match with those of the figure behind the Magdalen on the London panel.

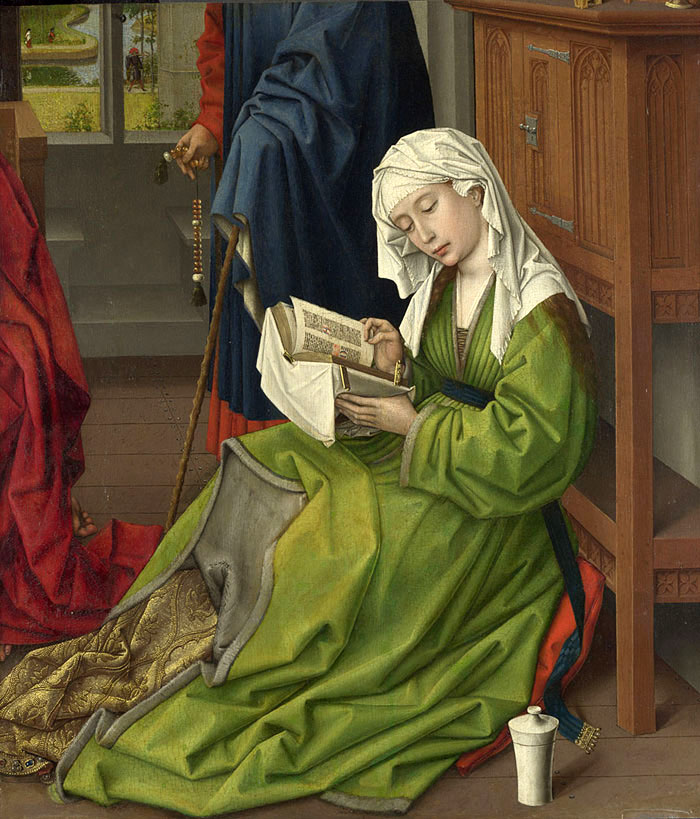
Rogier van der Weyden, The Magdalen Reading, 62.2 cm × 54.4 cm (24.5 in × 21.4 in). Date unknown but possibly 1435–38. Oil on oak panel. National Gallery, London.

There is a further small panel in Lisbon of a female head, richly or royally dressed, which first appeared in 1907 with the Joseph panel when it was recorded in the inventory of Leo Nardus at Suresnes. The figure may represent Saint Catherine of Alexandria, and from both the angle of her cloth and the fact that the river behind her would be parallel to that in the exterior of the London panel it can be assumed that she was kneeling. In the Stockholm drawing she is omitted, or only traces of her dress shown. The Joseph panel has a sliver of a view through a window to an exterior scene; if the other female is presumed to be kneeling, the trees above the waterway aligns with those in the London panel. Some art historians, including Martin Davies and John Ward, have been slow to allow the Catherine panel as part of the altarpiece, though it is undoubtedly by van der Weyden or a near-contemporary follower. Evidence against this link includes the fact that the moulding of the window to the left of the Gulbenkian female saint is plain, while that next to Saint Joseph is chamfered. Such an inconsistency in a single van der Weyden work is unusual. The panels are of equal thickness (1.3 cm) and of near-identical size; the Saint Catherine panel measures 18.6 cm × 21.7 cm (7.3 in × 8.5 in), the Saint Joseph 18.2 cm × 21 cm (7.2 in × 8.3 in).

Lorne Campbell thinks that though the Catherine head is "obviously less well drawn and less successfully painted than the Magdalen", it "seems likely" that all three fragments came from the same original work; he points out that "about half way up the right edge of this fragment ["Catherine"] is a small triangle of red, outlined by a continuous underdrawn brushstroke ... It is likely that the red is part of the contour of the missing figure of the Baptist". The small piece is on the outermost edge of the panel, and only visible when it was removed from the frame. Ward believes the piece corresponds directly with the folds of John's robes.

=== Drawing ===
The Stockholm drawing contains a narrow blank gap to the right of the bishop with a few indistinct lines that could represent the lower profile of the kneeling figure of Saint Catherine. Although none of the faces in the three surviving panels match any in the drawing, a 1971 reconstruction by art historian John Ward—which combined all of the works into a composition of a central Virgin and Child flanked by six saints—is widely accepted. The Stockholm drawing's original location or history before the 19th century is unknown, except that the verso shows a surviving carving of the Virgin and Child attributed to a Brussels workshop from about 1440. This carving is also now in Portugal.

== See also ==
- List of works by Rogier van der Weyden
