= Heinrich von Werl =

German Scotist philosopher

- Born: c. 1400
- Died: c. 1463

Heinrich von Werl (c. 1400 – c. 1463) was a German Scotist philosopher at Cologne, painted on the Werl Triptych by Robert Campin.

Duns Scotus died shortly after coming to teach in Cologne, and so Scotism had limited influence in Germany. He is buried in the Church of the Friars Minor there.
