= The Magdalen Reading =

Fragment of altarpiece painting by Rogier van der Weyden

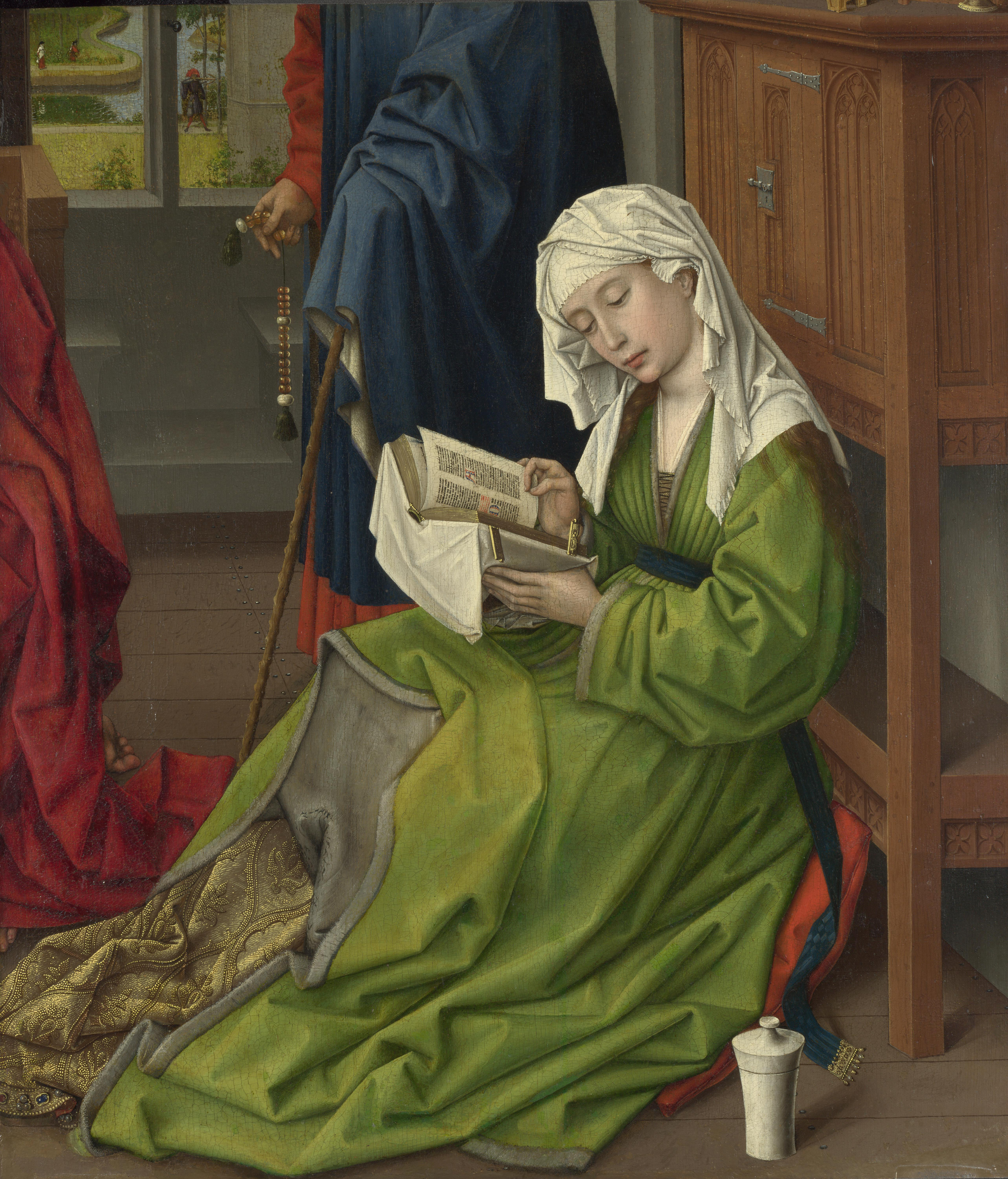
- Artist: Rogier van der Weyden
- Year: 1435–1438
- Type: Oil on mahogany, transferred from another panel.
- Dimensions: 62.2 cm × 54.4 cm (24.5 in × 21.4 in)
- Location: National Gallery, London

The Magdalen Reading is one of three surviving fragments of a large mid-15th-century oil-on-panel altarpiece by the Early Netherlandish painter Rogier van der Weyden. The panel, originally oak, was completed some time between 1435 and 1438 and has been in the National Gallery, London since 1860.

It shows a woman with the pale skin, high cheek bones and oval eyelids typical of the idealised portraits of noble women of the period. She is identifiable as the Magdalen from the jar of ointment placed in the foreground, which is her traditional attribute in Christian art. She is presented as completely absorbed in her reading, a model of the contemplative life, repentant and absolved of past sins. In Catholic tradition the Magdalen was conflated with both Mary of Bethany who anointed the feet of Jesus with oil and the unnamed "sinner" of Luke 7:36–50. Iconography of the Magdalen commonly shows her with a book, in a moment of reflection, in tears, or with eyes averted.

The background of the painting had been overpainted with a thick layer of brown paint. A cleaning between 1955 and 1956 revealed the figure standing behind the Magdalene and the kneeling figure with its bare foot protruding in front of her, with a landscape visible through a window. The two partially seen figures are both cut off at the edges of the London panel. The figure above her has been identified as belonging to a fragment in the Museu Calouste Gulbenkian, Lisbon, which shows the head of Saint Joseph, while another Lisbon fragment, showing what is believed to be Saint Catherine of Alexandria, is thought to be from the same larger work. The original altarpiece was a sacra conversazione, known only through a drawing, Virgin and Child with Saints, in Stockholm's Nationalmuseum, which followed a partial copy of the painting that probably dated from the late 16th century. The drawing shows that The Magdalen occupied the lower right-hand corner of the altarpiece. The Lisbon fragments are each a third of the size of The Magdalen, which measures 62.2 cm × 54.4 cm (24.5 in × 21.4 in).

Although internationally successful in his lifetime, van der Weyden fell from view during the 17th century, and was not rediscovered until the early 19th century. The Magdalen Reading can first be traced to an 1811 sale. After passing through the hands of a number of dealers in the Netherlands, the panel was purchased by the National Gallery, London, in 1860 from a collector in Paris. It is described by art historian Lorne Campbell as "one of the great masterpieces of 15th-century art and among van der Weyden's most important early works."

== Description ==
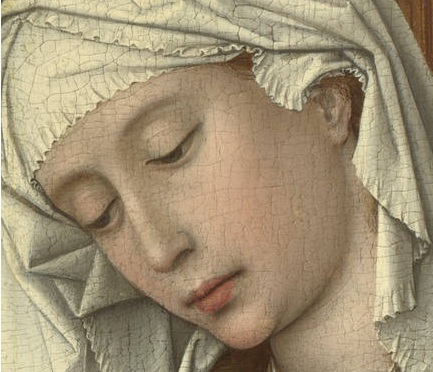
Detail showing the face and veil of Mary Magdalene painted in pure whites. The eyebrows and eyelids have been plucked in accordance with conventional ideals of beauty at the time.

Mary Magdalene as depicted in early Renaissance painting is a composite of various biblical figures. Here, she is based on Mary of Bethany, who is identified as the Magdalene in the Roman Catholic tradition. Mary of Bethany sat at Jesus' feet and "listened to His Word", and thus is seen as a contemplative figure. The counterpoint is Mary's sister Martha who, representative of the active life, wished that Mary would help her serve. Mary is shown by van der Weyden as youthful, sitting in quiet piety with her head tilted and eyes modestly averted from the viewer. She is absorbed in her reading of a holy book, the covers of which include a chemise of white cloth, a common form of protective binding. Four coloured cloth bookmarks are tied to a gold bar near the top of the spine. According to Lorne Campbell, the manuscript "looks rather like a 13th-century French Bible" and is "clearly a devotional text". It was rare for contemporary portraits to show women reading, and if the model herself could read then she was likely from a noble family.

Van der Weyden often linked form and meaning, and in this fragment the semicircular outline of the Magdalene reinforces her quiet detachment from her surroundings. She is seated on a red cushion and rests her back against a wooden sideboard. By her feet is her usual attribute of an alabaster jar; in the Gospels she brought spices to the tomb of Jesus. The view through the window is of a distant canal, with an archer atop the garden wall and a figure walking on the other side of the water, whose reflection shows in the water.

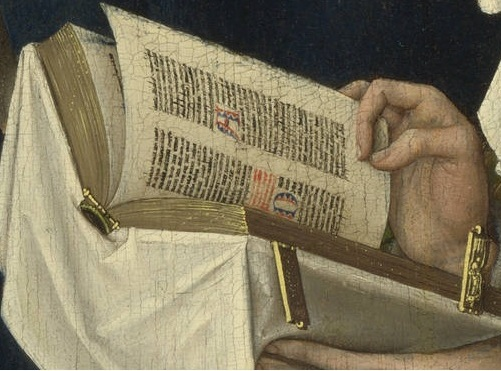
Detail showing the prayer book, likely a book of hours, decorated with white cloth and gold clasps.

Van der Weyden's pose for the Magdalene is similar to a number of female religious figures painted by his master Robert Campin or his workshop. It closely resembles, in theme and tone, the figure of Saint Barbara in Campin's Werl Altarpiece, and also the Virgin in an Annunciation attributed to Campin in Brussels. Typically for a van der Weyden, the Magdalen's face has an almost sculpted look, and the elements of her clothes are conveyed in minute detail. She wears a green robe; in medieval art the Magdalene is usually depicted naked (sometimes clad only in her long hair) or in richly coloured dress, typically red, blue or green, almost never in white. Her robe is tightly pulled below her bust by a blue sash, while the gold brocade of her underskirt is adorned by a jewelled hem. Art critic Charles Darwent observed that the Magdalen's past as a "fallen woman" is hinted at by the nap in the fur lining of her dress and the few strands of hair loose from her veil. Darwent wrote, "Even her fingers, absent-mindedly circled, suggest completeness. In her mix of purity and eroticism, van der Weyden's Magdalen feels whole; but she isn't." In the medieval period, fur symbolized female sexuality and was commonly associated with the Magdalene. Medieval historian Philip Crispin explains that artists such as Memling and Matsys often portrayed the Magdalen in furs and notes that she "is noticeably dressed in fur-lined garments in The Magdalen Reading by Rogier van der Weyden".

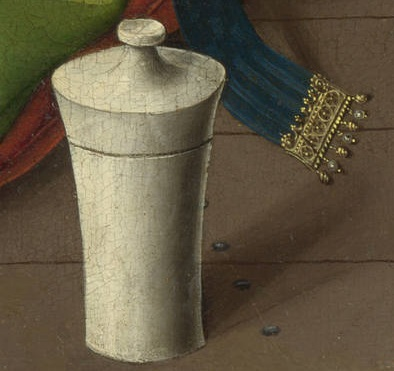
Detail showing the jar and row of nails on the timber floor at the lower right corner of the panel. Note the attention paid to the gilded clasp and fall of the shadow.

The level of detail used in portraying the Magdalene has been described by Campbell as "far exceed[ing]" van Eyck. Her lips are painted with a shades of vermilion, white and red which are mixed into each other to give a transparent look at the edges. The fur lining of her dress is painted in a range of greys running from almost pure white to pure black. Rogier gave the fur a textured look by painting stripes parallel to the line of the dress and then feathering the paint before it dried. The gold on the cloth is rendered with a variety of impasto, grid and dots of varying colour and size.

Many of the objects around her are also closely detailed, in particular the wooden floor and nails, the folds of the Magdalene's dress, the costume of the figures in the exterior and the beads of Joseph's rosary. The effect of falling light is closely studied; Joseph's crystal rosary beads have bright highlights, while subtle delineations of light and shade can be seen in the sideboard's tracery and in the clasps of her book. Mary is absorbed in her reading and seemingly unaware of her surroundings. Van der Weyden has given her a quiet dignity although he is generally seen as the more emotional of the master Netherlandish painters of the era, in particular when contrasted with Jan van Eyck.

Lorne Campbell describes the tiny figure of the woman seen through the window and her reflection in the water as "small miracles of painting", and says that "the attention to detail far exceeds that of Jan van Eyck and the skill of execution is astounding". He notes that these tiny details would have been impossible for a viewer to observe when the altarpiece was in its intended position. Other areas of the panel, however, have been described as dull and uninspired. One critic wrote that the areas of the floor and most of the cupboard behind her seem unfinished and "much too narrow and papery in effect". A number of objects placed on the cupboard are now barely visible save for their bases. The object on the right seated on legs alongside a box is likely a small pitcher, possibly a reliquary. A moulding to the left of the cupboard may represent a doorway.

== Altarpiece fragment ==
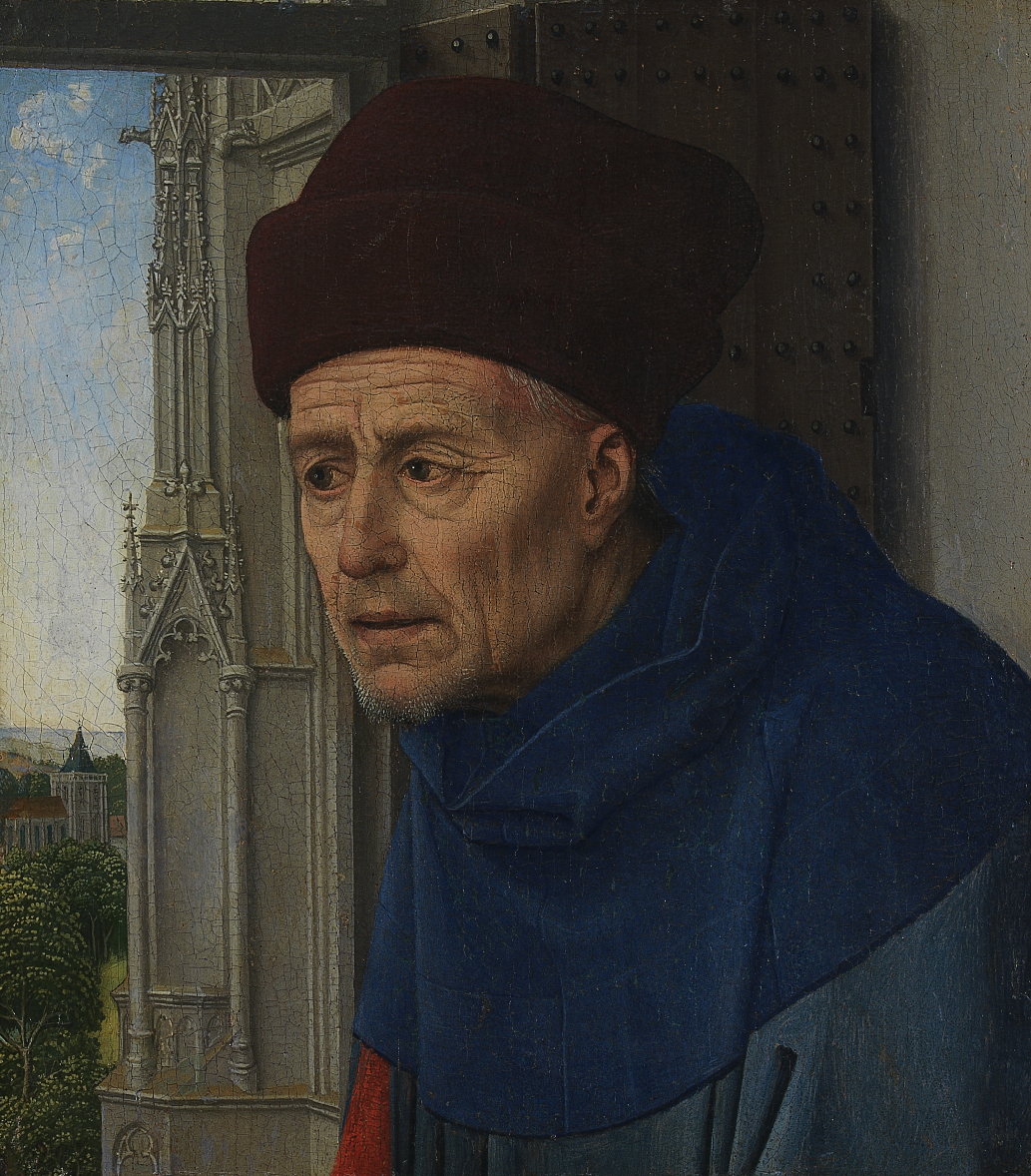
Head of Saint Joseph (fragment). 21 cm × 18 cm (8.3 in × 7.1 in). Museu Calouste Gulbenkian, Lisbon. This panel is thought to show Saint Joseph, whose body is visible to his upper arm in The Magdalen Reading.

Virgin and Child with Saints, a drawing in Stockholm's Nationalmuseum, is believed to be a study of a portion of the original altarpiece by a follower of van der Weyden, who possibly may have been the Master of the Coburger Rundblätter. The drawing has a loosely sketched background and shows, from left to right: an unidentified bishop saint with mitre and crosier making a blessing gesture; a narrow gap with a few wavy vertical lines suggesting a start at the outline of a further kneeling figure; a barefoot bearded figure in a rough robe identified as Saint John the Baptist; a seated Virgin holding on her lap the Christ Child who leans to the right, looking at a book; and holding the book, a kneeling beardless male identified as John the Evangelist. The drawing stops at the end of John's robe, at about the point on the London panel where Joseph's walking stick meets John and the Magdalene's robes. This suggests that the Magdalene panel was the first to be cut from the larger work.

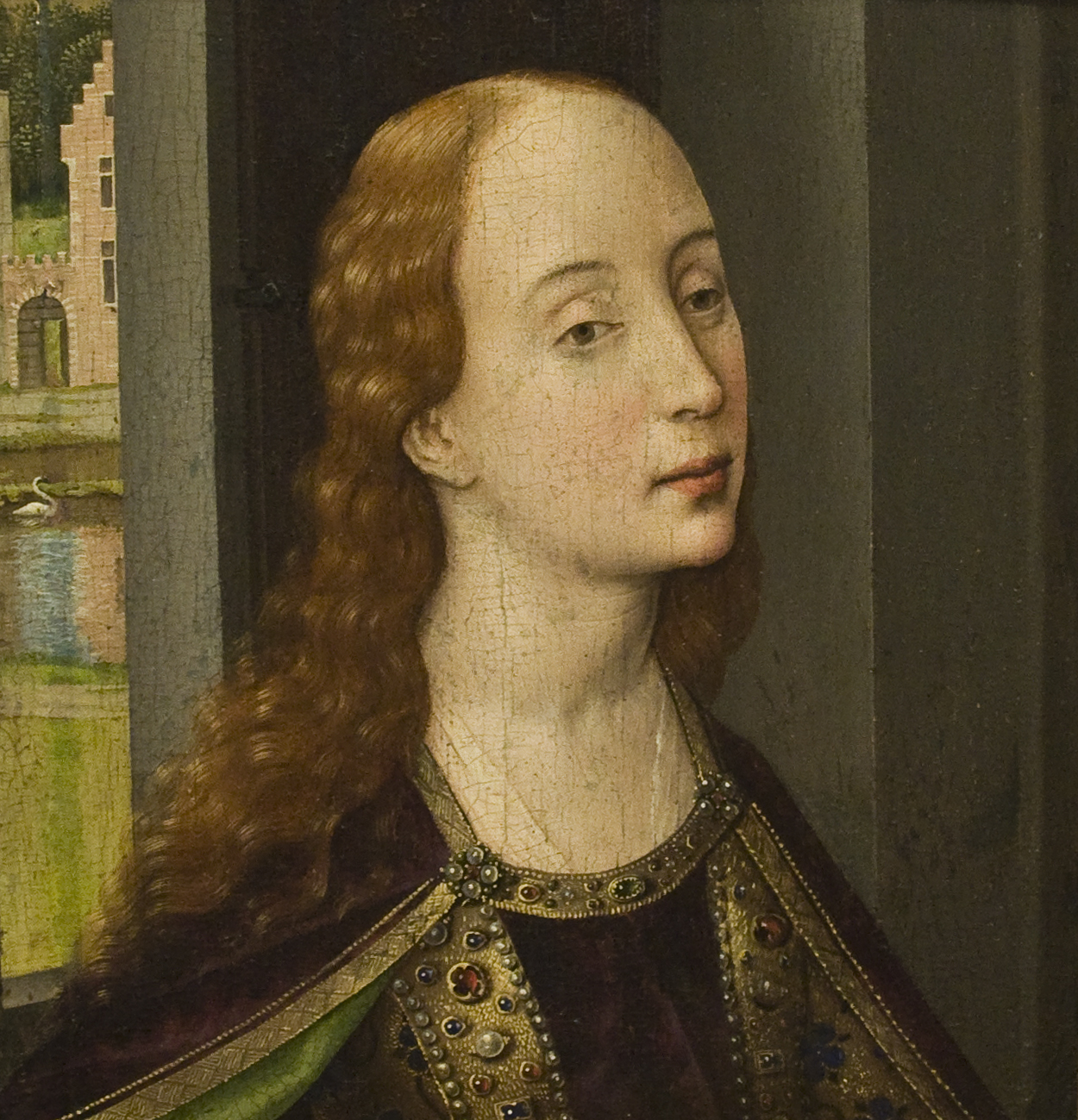
Head of a Female Saint (Saint Catherine?) (fragment). 21 cm × 18 cm (8.3 in × 7.1 in). Museu Calouste Gulbenkian, Lisbon. A possible representation of Saint Catherine of Alexandria, it is of lower quality than the other two known fragments, indicating that it was probably completed by members of van der Weyden's workshop.

At an unknown point before 1811, the original altarpiece was broken into at least three pieces, possibly due to damage, although The Magdalen fragment is in good condition. The black overpaint was likely added after the early 17th century when Netherlandish painting had fallen from favour and was unfashionable. Campbell believes that after the removal of the background detail "it looked sufficiently like a genre piece to hang in a well-known collection of Dutch seventeenth-century paintings". From the size of three surviving panels in relation to the drawing, it is estimated that the original was at least 1 m high by 1.5 m wide; the bishop and the Magdalene seem to clearly mark the horizontal extremities, but the extent of the picture above and below the surviving elements and the drawing cannot be judged. This size is comparable with smaller altarpieces of the period. The background was overpainted with a thick layer of black/brown pigment until it was cleaned in 1955; it was only after the layer's removal that it was linked to the upper body and head of Joseph from the Lisbon piece. These two works were not recorded in inventory until 1907, when they appear in the collection of Léo Lardus in Suresnes, France.

The London panel shows much of the clothing of two other figures from the original altarpiece. To the left of the Magdalene is the red robe of what appears to be a kneeling figure. The figure and robe, and less precisely the background, match a kneeling Saint John the Evangelist. Behind the Magdalen is a standing figure in blue and red robes, with linear rosary beads in one hand and a walking stick in the other. A panel at the Museu Calouste Gulbenkian in Lisbon shows the head of a figure believed to be the Saint Joseph; the background and clothes match with those of the figure behind the Magdalen on the London panel.

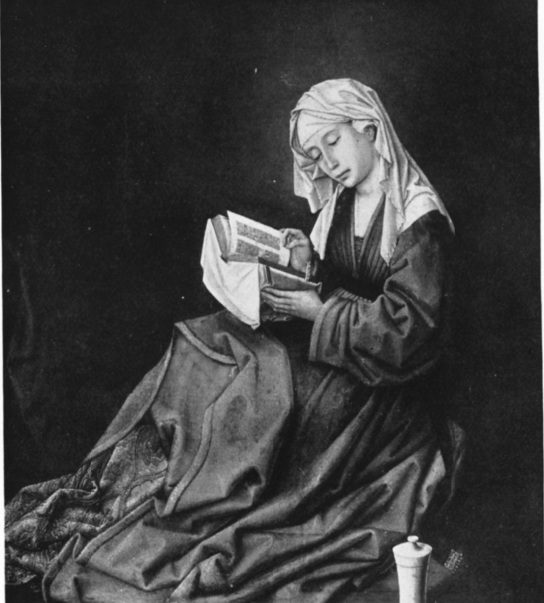
Cropped 1930s black and white photograph of the panel before it was cleaned of the overpaint. The reasons for the overpainting and the breaking up of the altarpiece are unknown.

There is a further small panel in Lisbon of a female head, richly or royally dressed, which first appeared in 1907 with the Joseph panel when it was recorded in the inventory of Leo Nardus at Suresnes. The figure may represent Saint Catherine of Alexandria, and from both the angle of her cloth and the fact that the river behind her would be parallel to that in the exterior of the London panel it can be assumed that she was kneeling. In the Stockholm drawing she is omitted, or only traces of her dress shown. The Joseph panel has a sliver of a view through a window to an exterior scene; if the other female is presumed to be kneeling, the trees above the waterway aligns with those in the London panel. Some art historians, including Martin Davies and John Ward, have been slow to allow the Catherine panel as part of the altarpiece, though it is undoubtedly by van der Weyden or a near-contemporary follower. Evidence against this link includes the fact that the moulding of the window to the left of the Gulbenkian female saint is plain, while that next to Saint Joseph is chamfered. Such an inconsistency in a single van der Weyden work is unusual. The panels are of equal thickness (1.3 cm) and of near-identical size; the Saint Catherine panel measures 18.6 cm × 21.7 cm (7.3 in × 8.5 in), the Saint Joseph 18.2 cm × 21 cm (7.2 in × 8.3 in).

Lorne Campbell thinks that though the Catherine head is "obviously less well drawn and less successfully painted than the Magdalen", it "seems likely" that all three fragments came from the same original work; he points out that "about half way up the right edge of this fragment ["Catherine"] is a small triangle of red, outlined by a continuous underdrawn brushstroke ... It is likely that the red is part of the contour of the missing figure of the Baptist". The small piece is on the outermost edge of the panel, and only visible when it was removed from the frame. Ward believes the piece corresponds directly with the folds of John's robes.

The Stockholm drawing contains a narrow blank gap to the right of the bishop with a few indistinct lines that could represent the lower profile of the kneeling figure of Saint Catherine. Although none of the faces in the three surviving panels match any in the drawing, a 1971 reconstruction by art historian John Ward—which combined all of the works into a composition of a central Virgin and Child flanked by six saints—is widely accepted. The Stockholm drawing's original location or history before the 19th century is unknown, except that the verso shows a surviving carving of the Virgin and Child attributed to a Brussels workshop from about 1440. This carving is also now in Portugal.

== Iconography ==
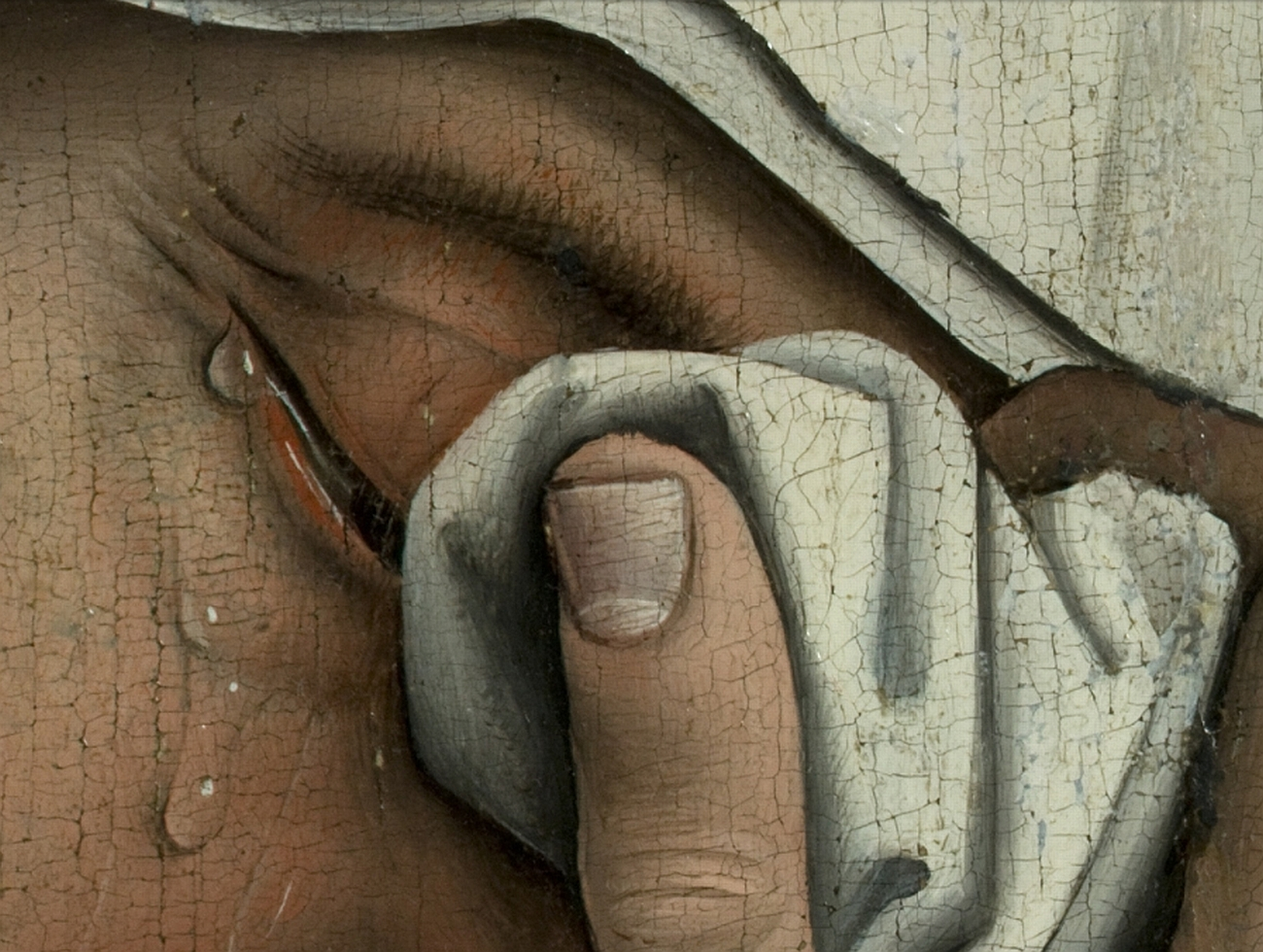
Detail from Descent from the Cross, c. 1435. Here van der Weyden portrays the tears and partially visible eyes of Mary of Clopas.

Van der Weyden's depiction of the Magdalen is based on Mary of Bethany, identified by the time of Pope Gregory I as the repentant prostitute of Luke 7:36–50. She then became associated with weeping and reading: Christ's mercy causes the eyes of the sinner to be contrite or tearful. Early Renaissance artists often conveyed this idea by portraying contemplative eyes, associating tears with words, and in turn weeping with reading. Examples can be seen in 16th-century works by Tintoretto and Titian which show the Magdalen reading, often with her eyes averted towards her book (and presumably away from a male gaze), or looking up to the heavens or, sometimes, glancing coyly towards the viewer. Writing in "The Crying Face", Mosche Barasch explains that in van der Weyden's time the gesture of averting or concealing the eyes became a "pictorial formula for crying".

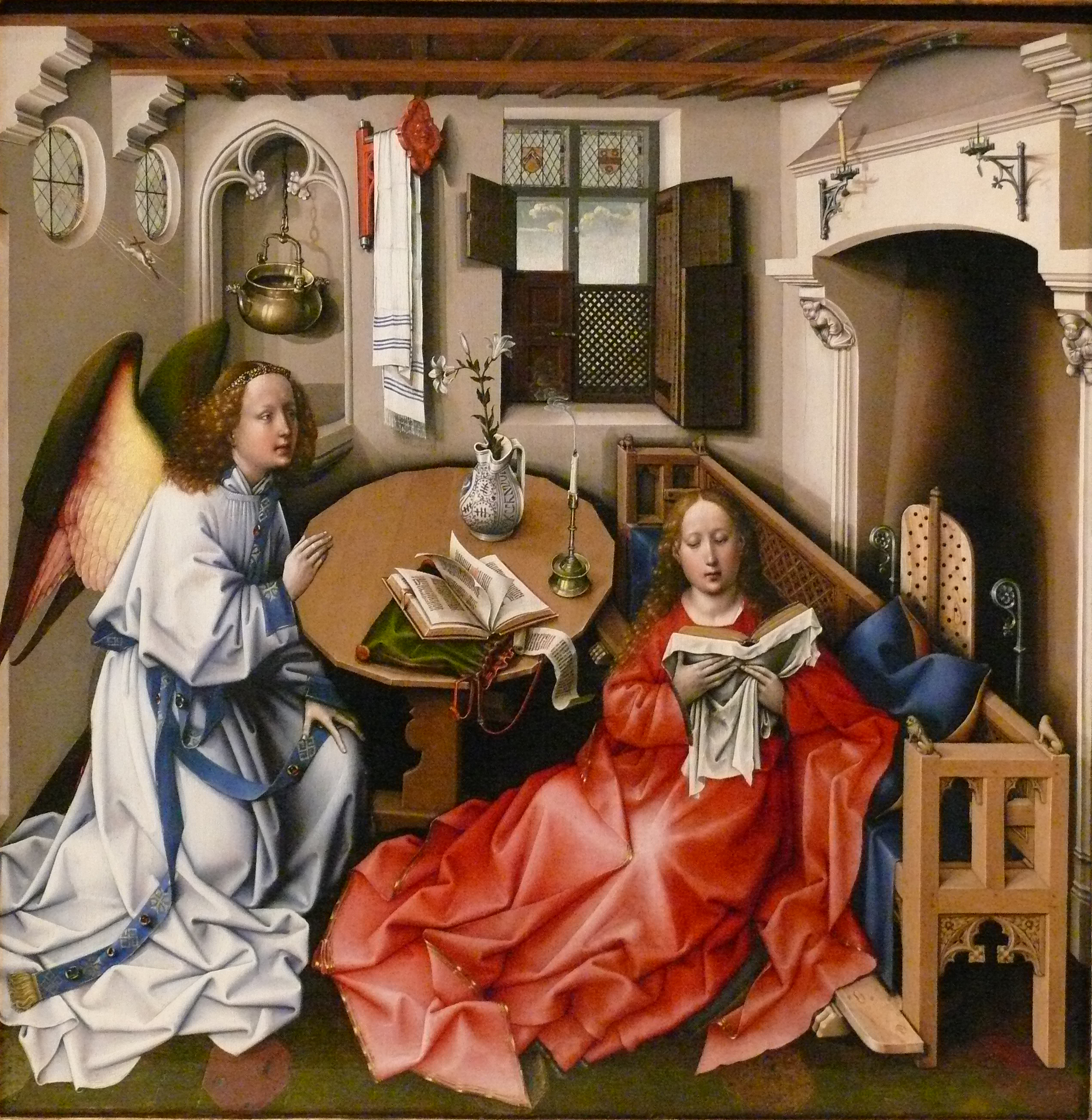
Robert Campin's Mérode Altarpiece or Annunciation Triptych, (centre panel), c 1427–1432, Metropolitan Museum of Art, New York; The Cloisters. The figure of the Virgin is close to van der Weyden's London Magdalen.

By the medieval period, reading became synonymous with devotion, which involved withdrawal from public view. Van der Weyden's placement of the Magdalen in an interior scene reflects the increasing literacy of domestic or laywomen in the mid-15th century. The increased production of devotional texts showed that noble women of the period routinely read texts such as a psalter or book of hours in the privacy of their homes. Whether the Magdalen herself was a reader, by the 17th century she was firmly established as such in the visual arts. Because the Magdalen was present at Christ's death and subsequent resurrection, she was seen as the bearer of news—a witness—and hence directly associated with the text.

The Magdalen imagery further draws on the idea of Christ as the word, represented by a book, with the Magdalen as the reader learning of her own life story in a moment of reflection and repentance. Her devotion to reading reflects her traditional status as the piously repentant harlot, as well as a prophetess or seer. According to legend, the Magdalen lived the last 30 years of her life as a hermit in Sainte-Baume and is often shown with a book, reading or writing, symbolizing her later years of contemplation and repentance. By the 13th century she acquired the imagery of a once-shamed woman who, clothed in long hair, now hid her nakedness in exile and "borne by angels, floats between heaven and earth".

The Magdalen's ointment jar was common in the lexicon of art in van der Weyden's period. Mary of Bethany may have used a jar when she repented of her sins at Christ's feet in her home; by the Renaissance, the image of the Magdalen was of the woman who bathed Christ's feet with her tears and dried them with her hair. She signified the "sacrament of anointing (Chrism and Unction)" by pouring precious spikenard on Christ's feet at his tomb.

== Dating and provenance ==
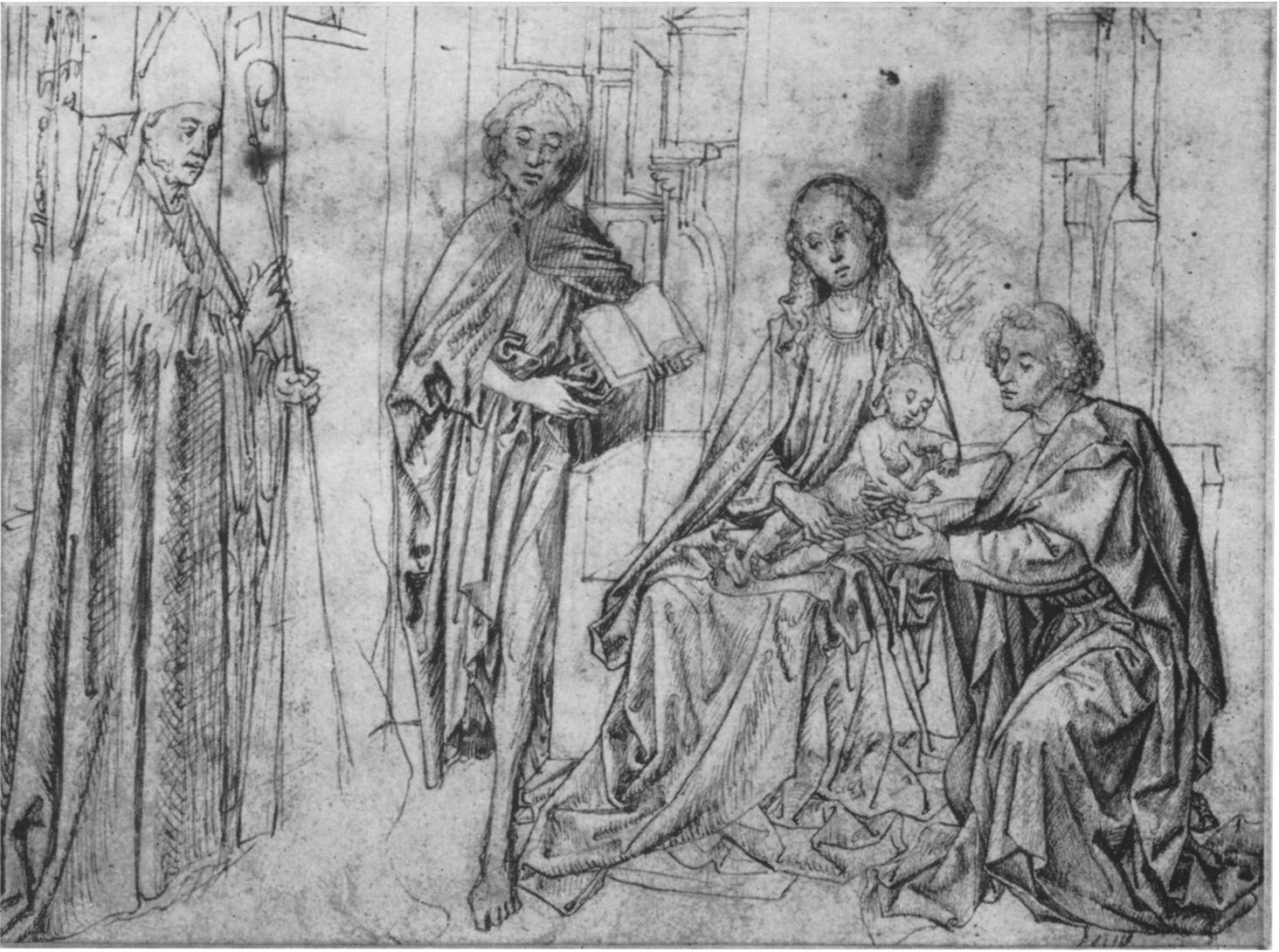
The Stockholm drawing, attributed to the Master of the Coburger Rundblätter, likely shows the portion of the altarpiece to the left of the Magdalen. The kneeling figure to the far right is probably Saint John the Evangelist, some of whose red drapery can be seen in the London fragment. Mary's position on the lower right hand corner (out of view) is guessed at by Ward from van der Weyden's positioning of similar figures in other works.

The altarpiece's date is uncertain but believed to be between 1435 and 1438. Van der Weyden was made painter to the city of Brussels in 1435, and it is believed to have been painted after this appointment. The National Gallery gives "before 1438". Art historian John Ward notes that the altarpiece was one of van der Weyden's first masterpieces, created early in his career when he was still heavily influenced by Robert Campin. He proposes a c. 1437 date based on similarities to Campin's Werl Altarpiece.

Because van der Weyden, like most of the early Netherlandish painters, was not rediscovered until the early 19th century, many of his works were wrongly attributed or dated, and major pieces such as the Berlin Miraflores Altarpiece continue to emerge. Conversely, when a number of pieces considered either by van der Weyden or assistants under his supervision were cleaned in the mid- to late 20th century, his hand or direct influence was disproved, or in the case of the Magdalen, associated with other images whose attribution had been uncertain.

The Magdalen Reading can first be traced to an 1811 sale of the estate of Cassino, a little-known collector in Haarlem, when the work was already cut down. The painting is recorded in the inventory of Demoiselles Hoofman, also of Haarlem. After passing to the Nieuwenhuys brothers, who were leading dealers in art of the early Netherlandish period, it moved to the collector Edmond Beaucousin in Paris, whose "small but choice" collection of early Netherlandish paintings was purchased for the National Gallery, London by Charles Lock Eastlake in 1860; an acquisition that also included two Robert Campin portraits and panels by Simon Marmion (1425–1489). This was during a period of acquisition intended to establish the international prestige of the gallery. Probably before 1811, all the background except the red robe on the left and the alabaster jar and floorboards was overpainted in plain brown, which was not removed until the cleaning begun in 1955. In general the "painted surface is in very good condition", although better in the parts that were not overpainted, and there are a few small losses.

The Magdalen Reading was transferred from its original oak to a mahogany panel (West Indian swietenia) by unknown craftsmen sometime between 1828 and when the National Gallery acquired it in 1860. Campbell states that the transfer was "Certainly after 1828, probably after 1845, and certainly before 1860", the year it was acquired by the National Gallery. Artificial ultramarine-coloured paint found in the transfer ground indicates that the change of panel took place after 1830. The heads in Lisbon are still on their original oak panels. The Stockholm drawing was discovered in a German inventory c. 1916 and is likely of Swedish origin. It was bequeathed by a Norwegian collector, Christian Langaad, to the Swedish National Museum of Fine Arts in 1918.

== Gallery ==
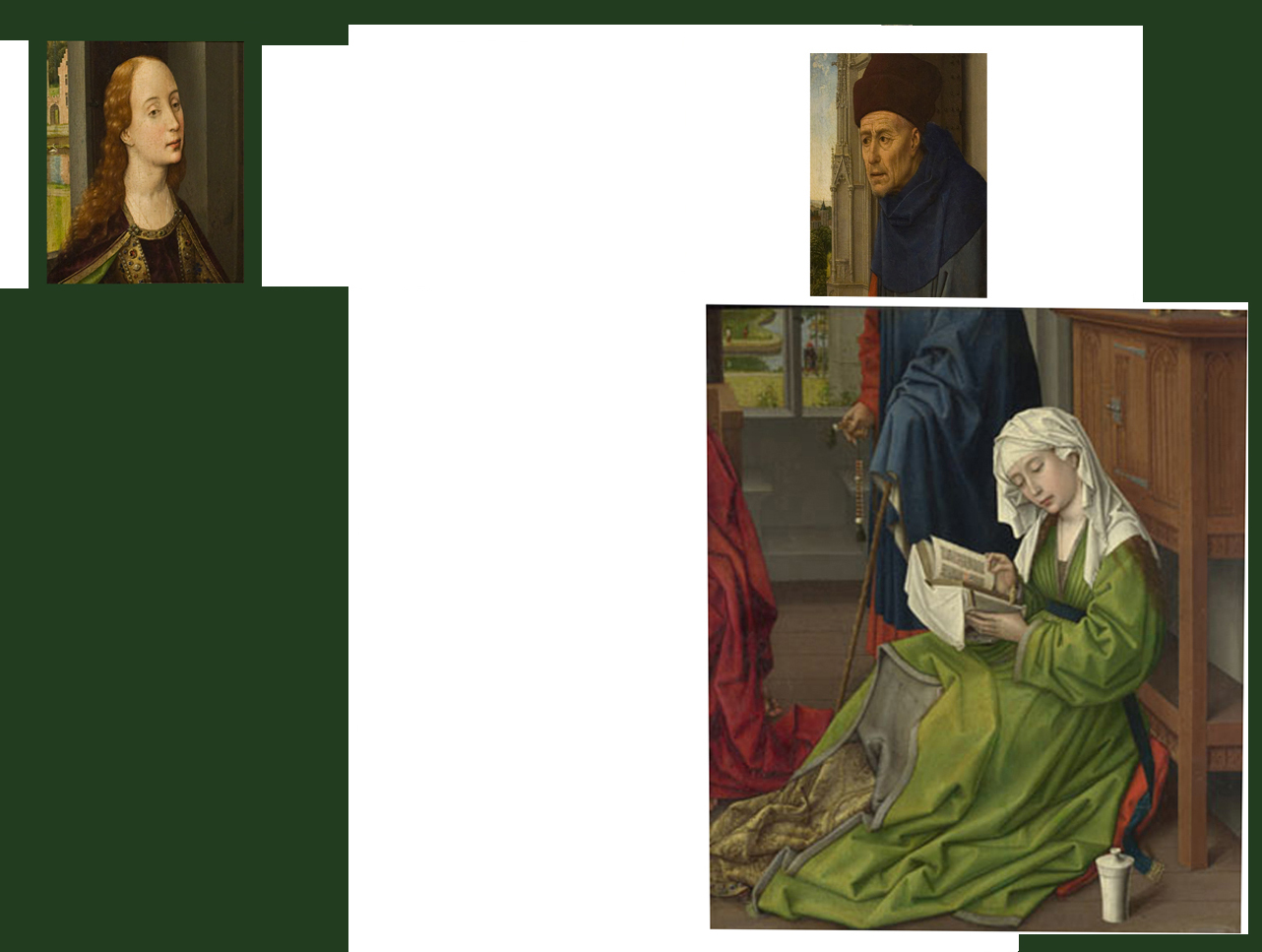
Partial reconstruction of the larger painting with Catherine, Joseph and Mary Magdalen

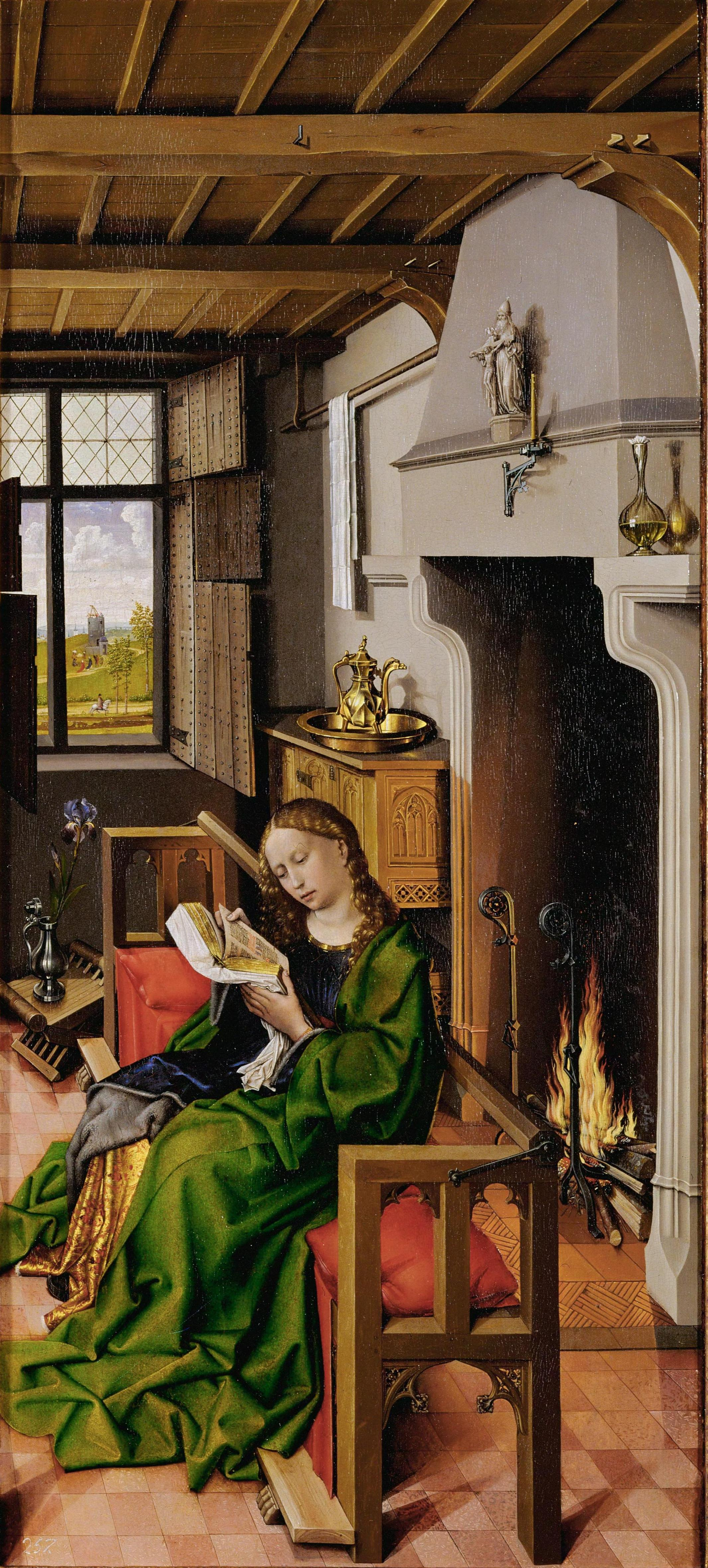
Saint Barbara from the right hand wing of Robert Campin's Werl Altarpiece, 1438. Museo del Prado, Madrid. Campin was master to van der Weyden and strongly influenced his work. Note how, as with van der Weyden's image, the only movement in this very still image is the turning page

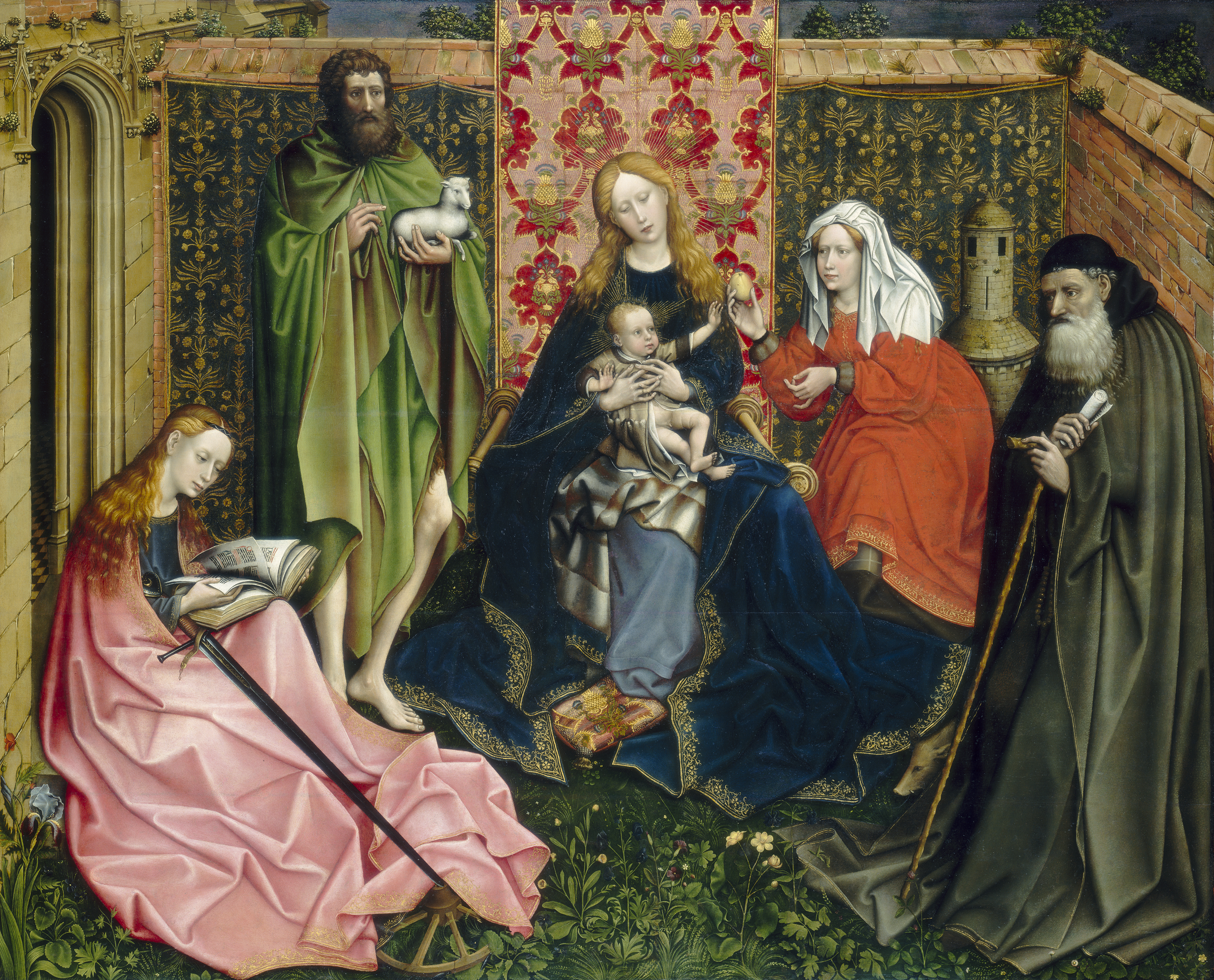
Madonna and Child with Saints in the Enclosed Garden, c. 1440/1460. Master of Flémalle or Workshop of Robert Campin. National Gallery of Art, D.C. Campin's influence is seen in the seated, reading St. Catherine, the heavy folds of her dress, and the enclosed garden (domestic interior) itself.

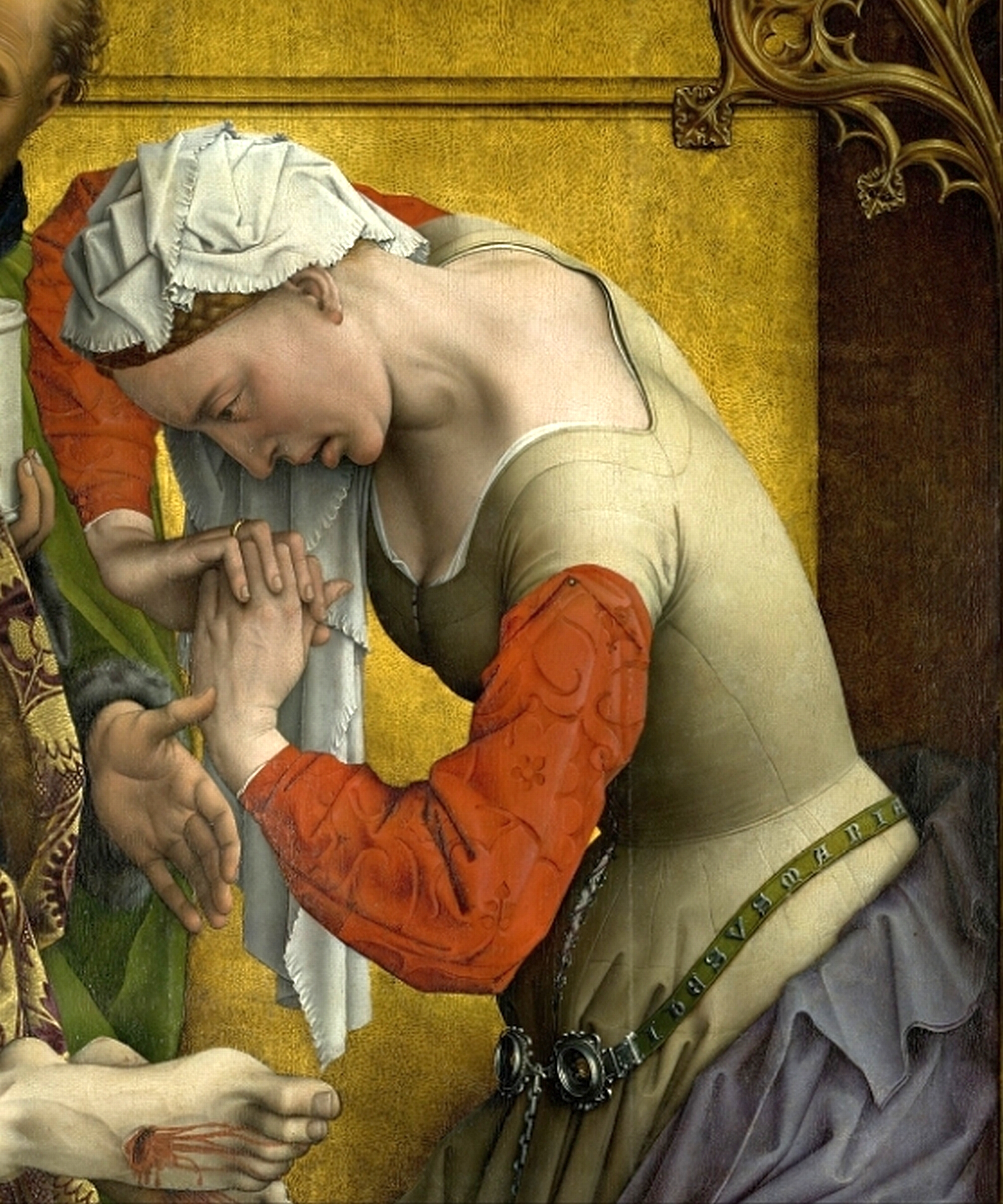
Detail from Descent from the Cross depicting Mary Magdelen. The altarpiece was completed a year or two before The Magdalen Reading.

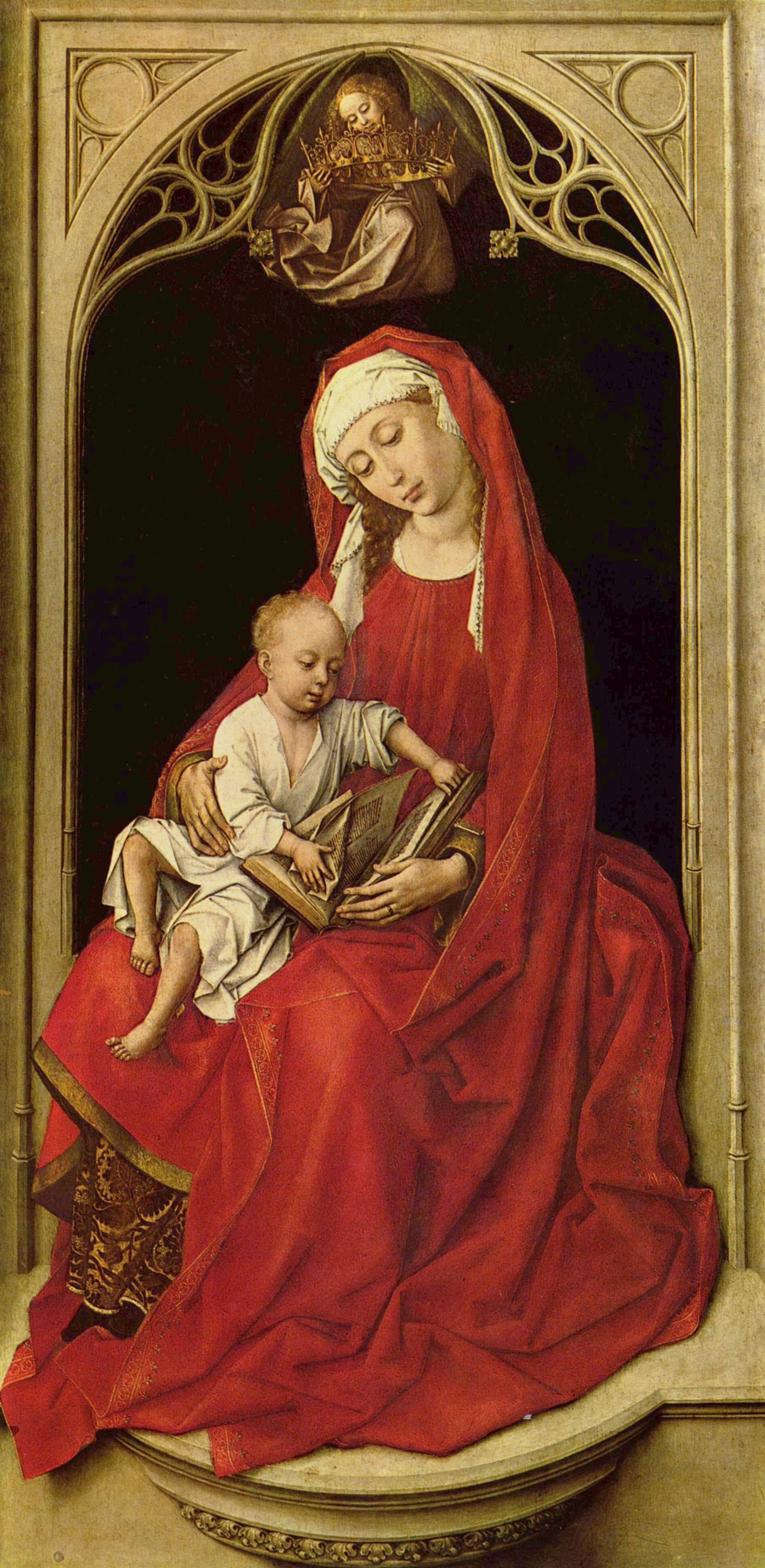
The Durán Madonna is believed to have been completed around the same time as The Magdelen Reading.

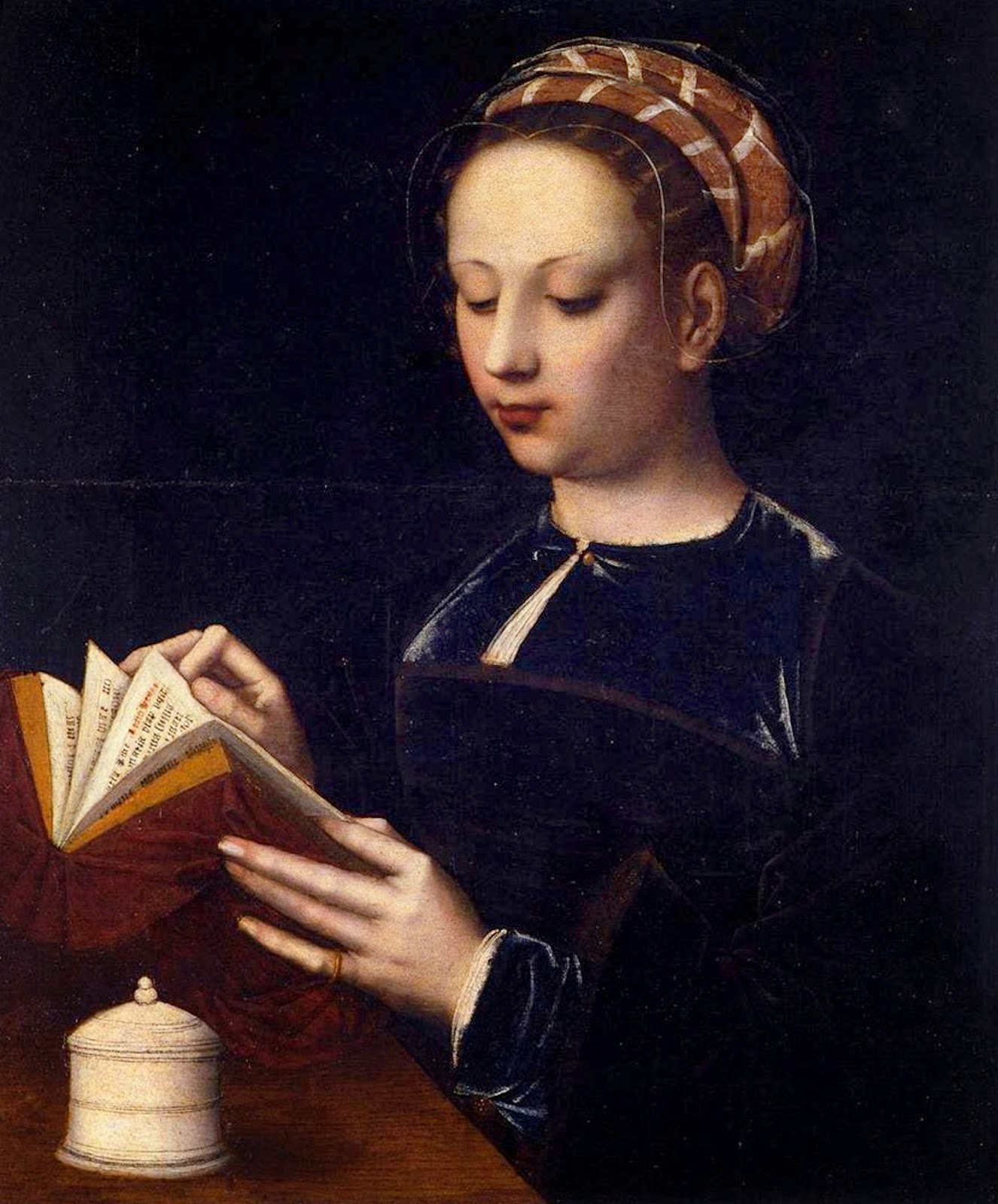
Ambrosius Benson, The Magdalen Reading, c 1525. This work shares van der Weyden's emphasis on the volume and bulk of her book, and similarly concentrates on her delicately rendered fingers.
