= Werl Triptych =

1438 altarpiece by Robert Campin

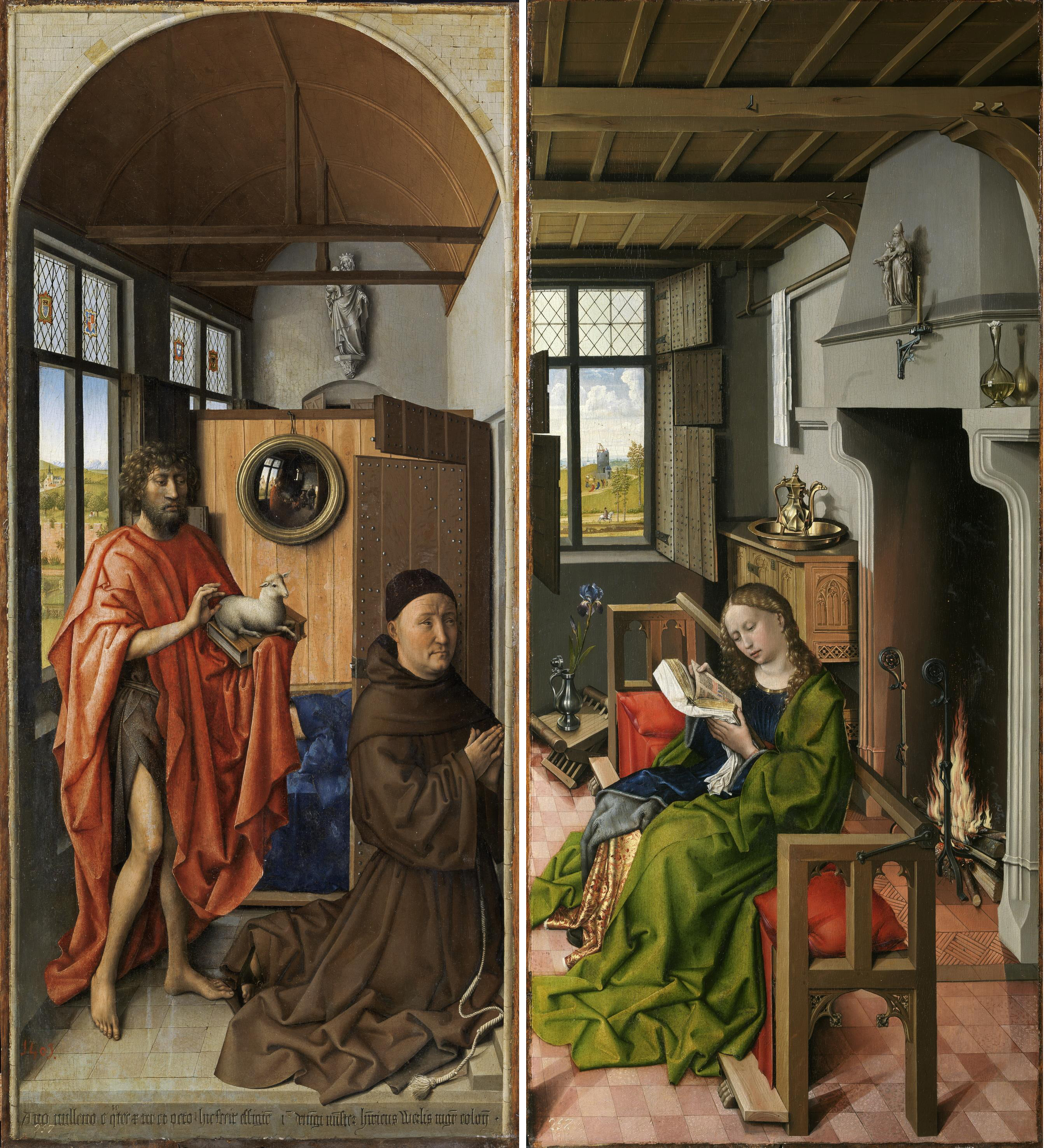
The two surviving wings of The Werl Altarpiece, 1438

The Werl Triptych (or Triptych of Heinrich von Werl) is a triptych altarpiece completed in Cologne in 1438, of which the centre panel has been lost. The two remaining wings are now in the Prado in Madrid. It was long attributed to the Master of Flémalle, now generally believed to have been Robert Campin, although this identity is not universally accepted. Some art historians believe it may have been painted as a pastiche by either the workshop or a follower of Campin or the Master of Flémalle.

The right-hand wing depicts a seated, pious Saint Barbara, who is shown engrossed in her reading of a bound and gilded holy book, seated in front of a warm, open fire which lights the room with a golden glow. The left wing has a donor portrait of Heinrich von Werl, who kneels in prayer in the company of John the Baptist facing the missing devotional centre-panel scene, which is lost and unrecorded. The two extant panels are in Madrid and renowned for their complex treatment of both light and form. The panels became influential on other artists from the mid-15th until the early 16th century, after when Early Netherlandish painting fell out of favour until it was rediscovered in the early 19th century.

From an inscription in the left wing, the panels are known to have been commissioned by Heinrich von Werl, the provincial head of Cologne, in 1438. He is shown in the left wing kneeling in devotion alongside Saint John the Baptist. This panel contains a number of elements indebted to Jan van Eyck, notably the convex mirror in the midground, which as with the 1434 Arnolfini Portrait, reflects the scene back at the viewer.

== Description ==
Although the centre panel is lost with no surviving copies, inventory records or descriptions, it has been speculated that it was set in the same room occupied by Saint Barbara. This is likely given the abrupt end of the lines of the beams of the roof and the frames of the window, as well as the direction of the falling light. The centre panel may have formed the setting for a Virgo inter Virgines. Given that there is no surviving evidence of the triptych's influence on Cologne art until the middle of the century, it was likely the triptych was until then positioned either in private or in an inaccessible place in the church large enough to hold a number of altarpieces. However it became influential from the mid-15th century.

Of the two panels, Barbara's, although flawed in some anatomical respects, is richer in detail and considered the superior piece.

=== Right panel: Saint Barbara ===
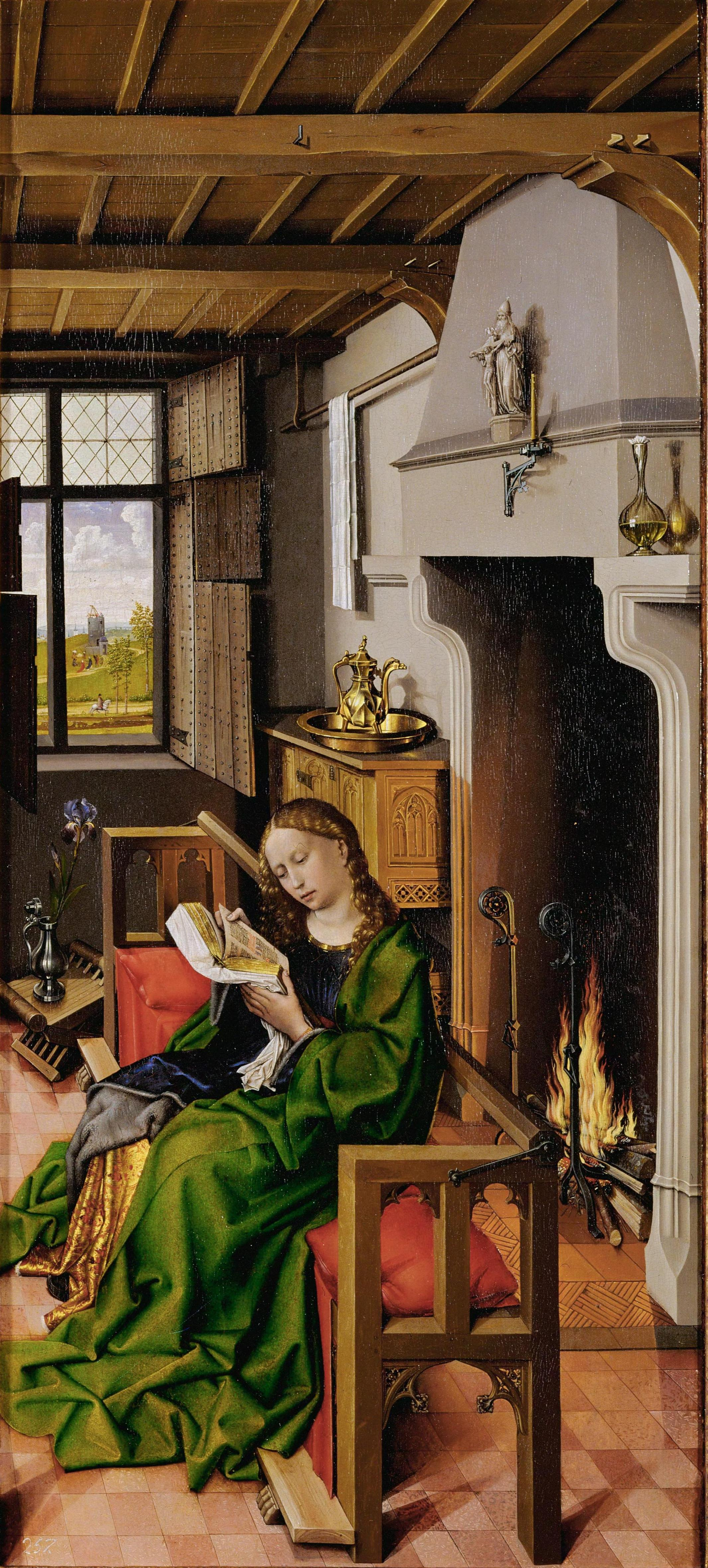
Right wing showing Saint Barbara. Oak panel, 101 cm x 47 cm. Museo del Prado.

The woman in this panel can be identified as Saint Barbara from the tower visible beyond the open window to her top left. A popular saint in the Middle Ages, she was a Christian martyr believed to have lived in the 3rd century. According to hagiography, her wealthy pagan father Dioscorus, seeking to preserve her from unwelcome suitors, imprisoned her in a tower. Captive Barbara let in a priest who baptised her, an act for which she was hunted and eventually beheaded by her father. She became a popular subject for artists of Campin's generation. Jan van Eyck left a highly detailed but unfinished 1437 oak panel which focuses on the highly complex architectural details of an imagined Gothic tower.

Annunciation, Jan van Eyck, 1434–1436. National Gallery of Art, Washington. Note the monumental size of the figures, which are out of proportion to their surroundings.

The artist depicts Barbara imprisoned in her tower but engrossed in her reading of a book with her back against a large open fireplace. Her brown hair is unbound and falling to her shoulders. She is seated on a wooden bench draped with deep red velvet cushions. She wears a sumptuous green dress lined with heavy angular folds. Yet Barbara's figure is weakly rendered – her shoulders and knees are anatomically unrealistic; she seems boneless.

The panel's strength comes from her well-described clothing and the highly detailed objects placed around her, most of which are shaped and contrasted by the two sources of light falling on their generally golden and polished surfaces. The fireplace emits a warm reddish glow, which contrasts with the relatively hard light falling from the window and the unseen middle panel to the left. The ledge of the fireplace holds a glass flask while the chimney place contains a sconce holding an extinguished candle holder. A highly detailed sculpture of the Trinity is shown above the fireplace.

The room is obviously from a contemporary middle-class rather than biblical setting, and contains many of the same details found in the centre panel of the c 1425–28 Mérode Altarpiece, also attributed to Robert Campin. These include the latticed and shuttered window, the reading Virgin seated on a long bench, and the tilted iris (instead of lily) in a vase on a table to her side. Writers Peter and Linda Murray note that the treatment in the later work is better arranged and far more assured in its use of perspective.

The perspective from which the room is viewed is unusually steep and positions the viewer as if he is on a higher floor than the Virgin and looking down at her. It has been identified as influenced by van Eyck's Washington Annunciation painted just a few years earlier. The painting contains a number of vanishing points stretching from the lower right hand to the open window serve to emphasise the panel's depth. The steep angle of the panel from the viewer's point of view is achieved through the tilt of the bench, sideboard, line of the fireplace, and shutters of the window. According to Walther Ingo, the dramatic angle of these elements serves to demote the figure of St Barbara to secondary importance to an examination of the anatomy of the space itself.

=== Left panel: Saint John and donor ===
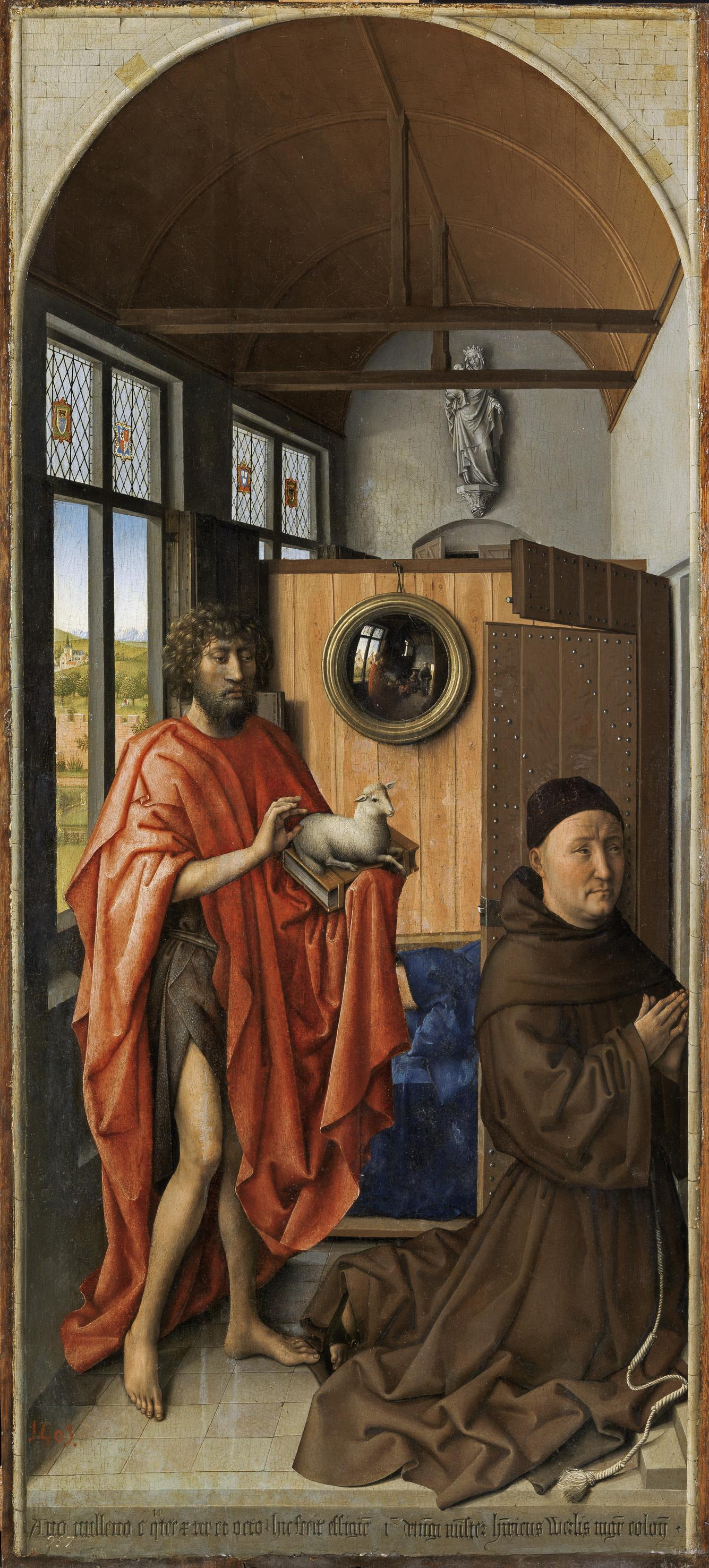
Left wing with donor portrait of Heinrich von Werl and Saint John the Baptist

The donor, Heinrich von Werl, is named in the Latin inscription on the left wing, which translates as; "In the year 1438 Minister Heinrich von Werl, master of Cologne, has this image painted" (Anno milleno c quater x ter et octo. hic fecit effigiem ... depingi minister hinricus Werlis magister coloniensis). Von Werl was a member of the Minorites order (today known as the Franciscan order) in Osnabrück. He moved to Cologne in 1430 to study at the university, where he received a magister degree in 1435, having earlier been appointed provincial of Cologne province. He probably commissioned this work for the Minorite church in Cologne. He died in retirement in Osnabrück in 1463.

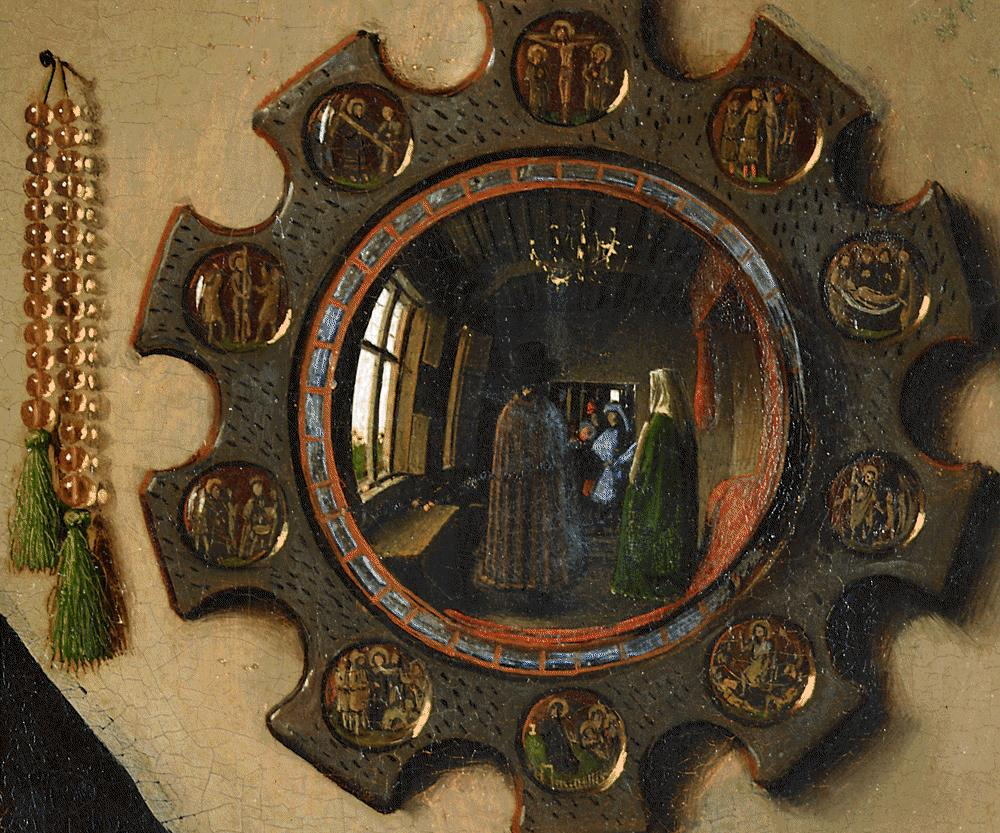
Detail from Jan van Eyck's 1434 Arnolfini Portrait showing the convex mirror place on the wall behind the couple

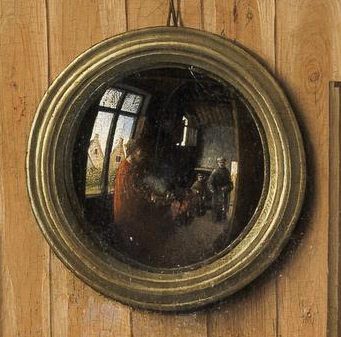
Detail from the left hand panel of the Werl Triptych painted four years later

The panel shows von Werl kneeling in prayer as he is presented by John the Baptist in a domed interior. Campin was heavily influenced by van Eyck by the early 1430s, and this wing is indebted to him in a number of ways; in the fall of light, sharp detail and especially the convex mirror in the middle ground which reflects the scene back at the viewer, a direct reference to van Eyck's 1434 Arnolfini Portrait. The form of the lettering on this wing identifies both the donor and date and is heavily influenced by van Eyck's elegant, almost decorative, inscriptions.

The painting is typical of early commissioned altarpieces in that the donor is not included in the central devotional scene. Instead, he is demoted to a side panel as a witness to the divine who are visible through the doorway connecting the wing to the central panel. Campin's Mérode Altarpiece, painted after 1422, places the donor wing in an exterior setting in a garden below the level of the Virgin, where he is placed in an interior. Although the door in the earlier work connects the space of the donor and Virgin, it is open and seemingly obstructs his view of the Virgin. Campin's early altarpieces, unlike those of van Eyck's, stick with the traditional hieratic form of a centre panel reserved for the devotional scene, and are physically and spatially removed from the wings. In the Werl Triptych, the donor is a mere witness rather than a protagonist, although he is positioned in an interior rather than an exterior setting. The triptych further introduces the idea of the intermediary saint, again a van Eyeckian influence; here represented by John the Baptist seen holding a lamb in the same panel as von Werl, increasing the significance of the area occupied by the donor.

== Attribution and provenance ==
The painting was earlier associated with either Campin's pupil Rogier van der Weyden, or van der Weyden's workshop. However, the discovery of underdrawings in both this work and the Mérode Altarpiece leads most art historians to believe that they are by the same artist. The work has been identified as among Campin's late works by Panofsky (1953) and Chatelet (1996), although a number of others, including Kemperdick (1997), Thurlemann (2003) and Sanders (2009) continue to argue van der Weyden or his circle's authorship. It is still a minority view, not held by the Prado; according to Till-Holger Borchert, "the figure style – which...cannot be reconciled with Rogier's – would seem to speak against this."

== Gallery ==
=== Details ===
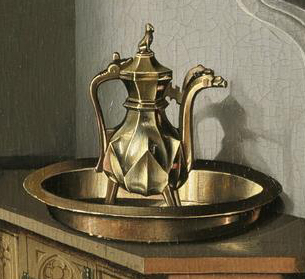
Detail of the gilded pot on the cupboard ledge to Barbara's left

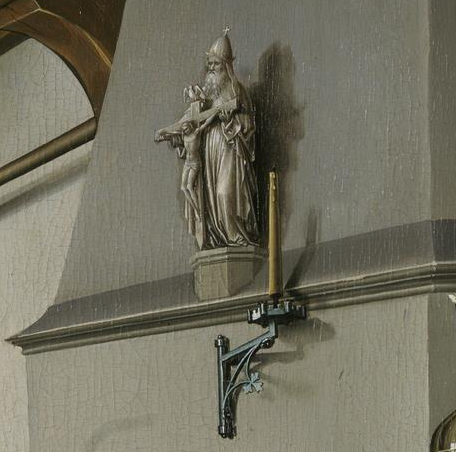
Detail of the sculpture of the Trinity shown above the fireplace in the right panel

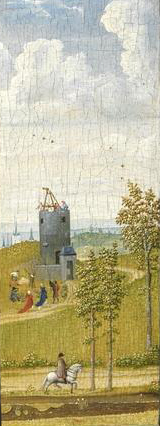
Detail of the tower seen through the open window. This tiny detail identifies the woman with the legend of Saint Barbara

=== Similar contemporary works ===
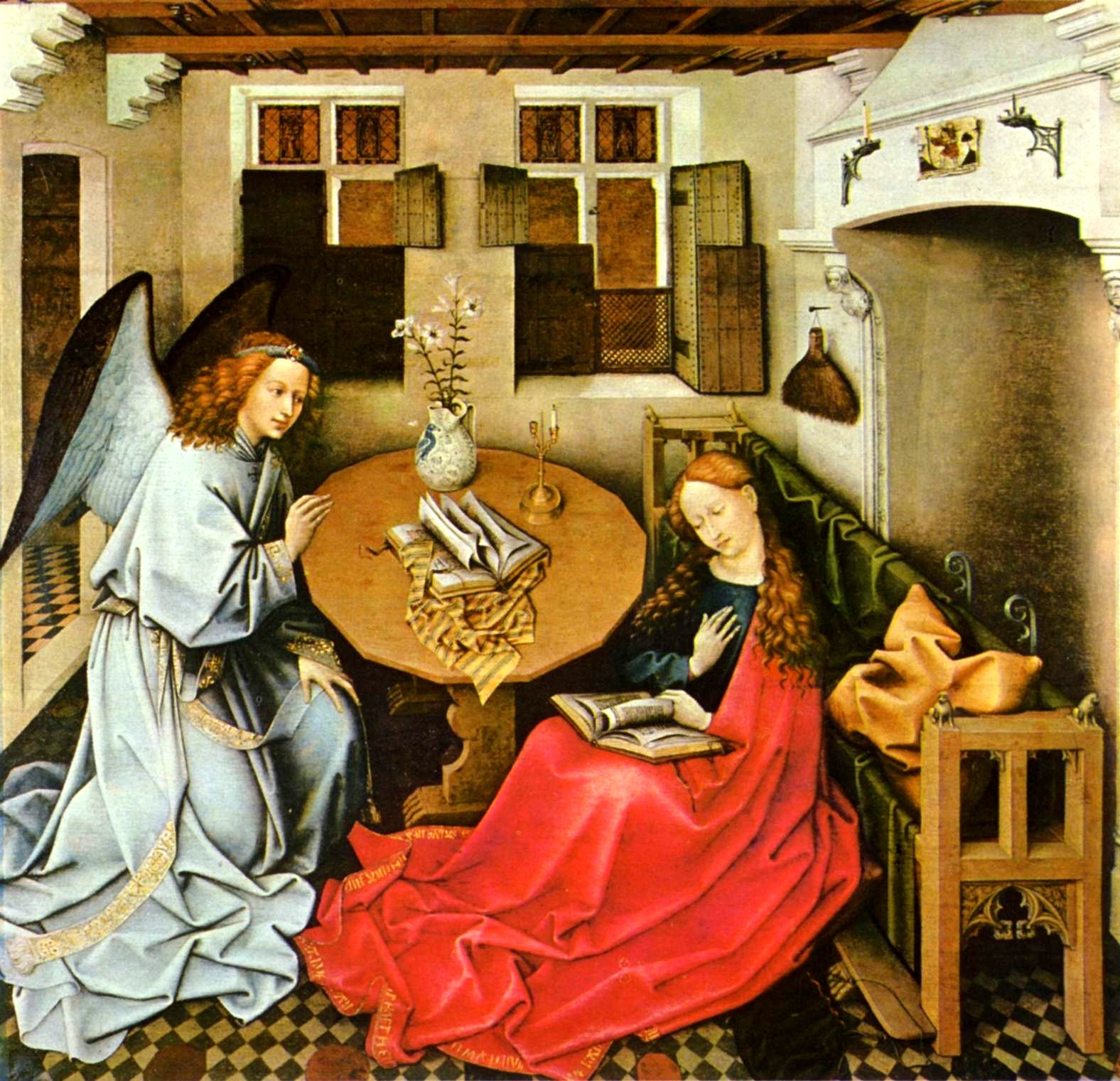
Central panel of the Brussels Mérode Altarpiece, 1425–1428

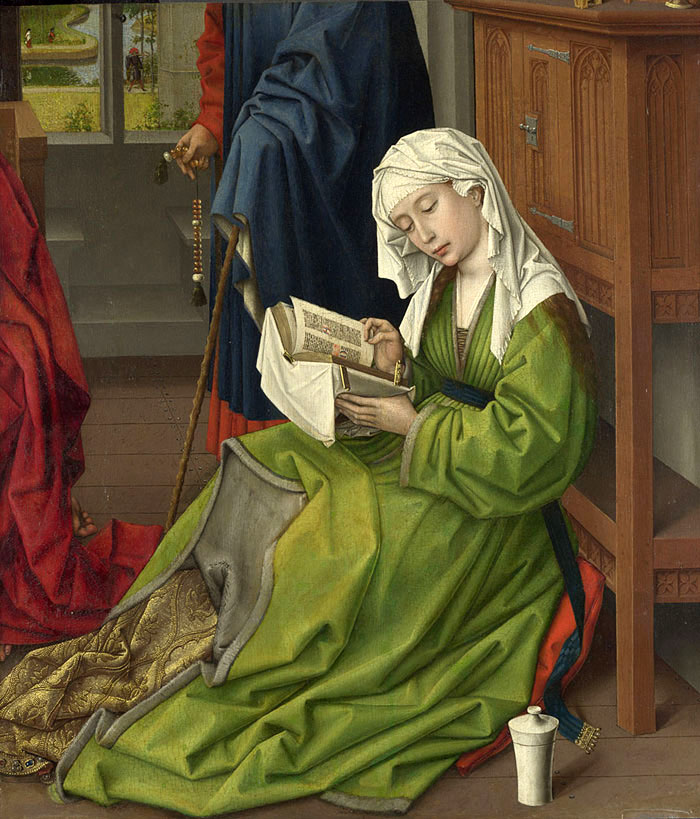
Rogier van der Weyden, The Magdalen Reading, c 1435–1438. Van der Weyden was heavily influenced by Campin, as evidenced in this early masterpiece

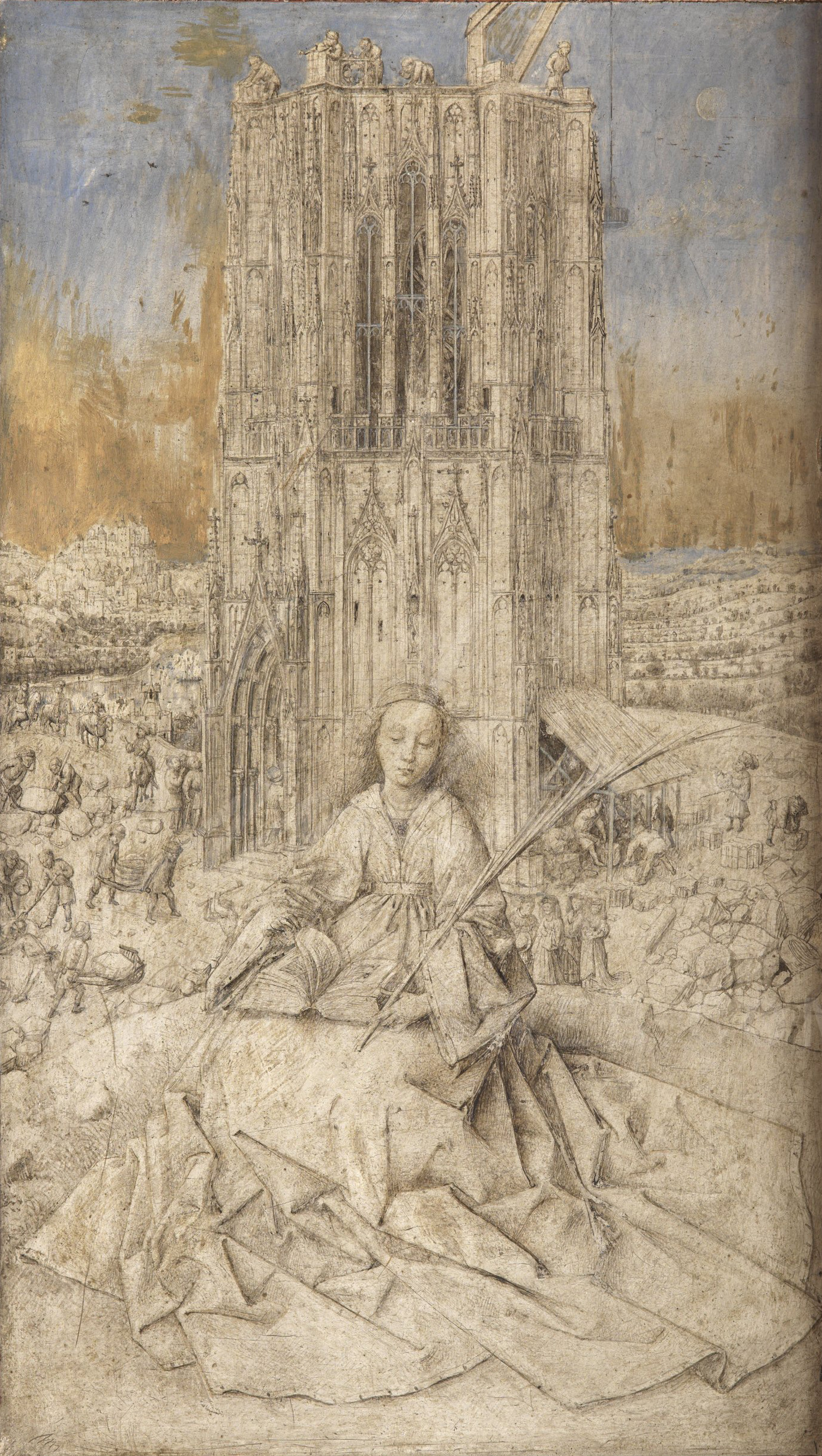
Saint Barbara, Oil on panel, Jan van Eyck, 1437

== Sources ==
- Blum, Shirley. 1969. Early Netherlandish Triptychs. Los Angeles: University of California Press.
- Borchert, Till-Holger. "Saint Barbara". In: Van Eyck to Durer. Borchert, Till-Holger (ed). London: Thames & Hudson, 2011. ISBN 978-0-500-23883-7
- Cambell, Lorne. "Robert Campin, the Master of Flémalle and the Master of Mérode". Burlington Magazine 116, 1974. 645.
- Jones, Susan Frances. Van Eyck to Gossaert. National Gallery, 2011. ISBN 1-85709-505-7
- Smith, Jeffrey Chips. The Northern Renaissance. London: Phaidon Press, 2004. ISBN 0-7148-3867-5
- Trio, Paul; De Smet, Marjan. The use and abuse of sacred places in late medieval towns. Leuven: Leuven University Press, 2006. ISBN 90-5867-519-X
