= Pasquier Grenier =

Flemish tapestry and wine merchant (d. 1493)

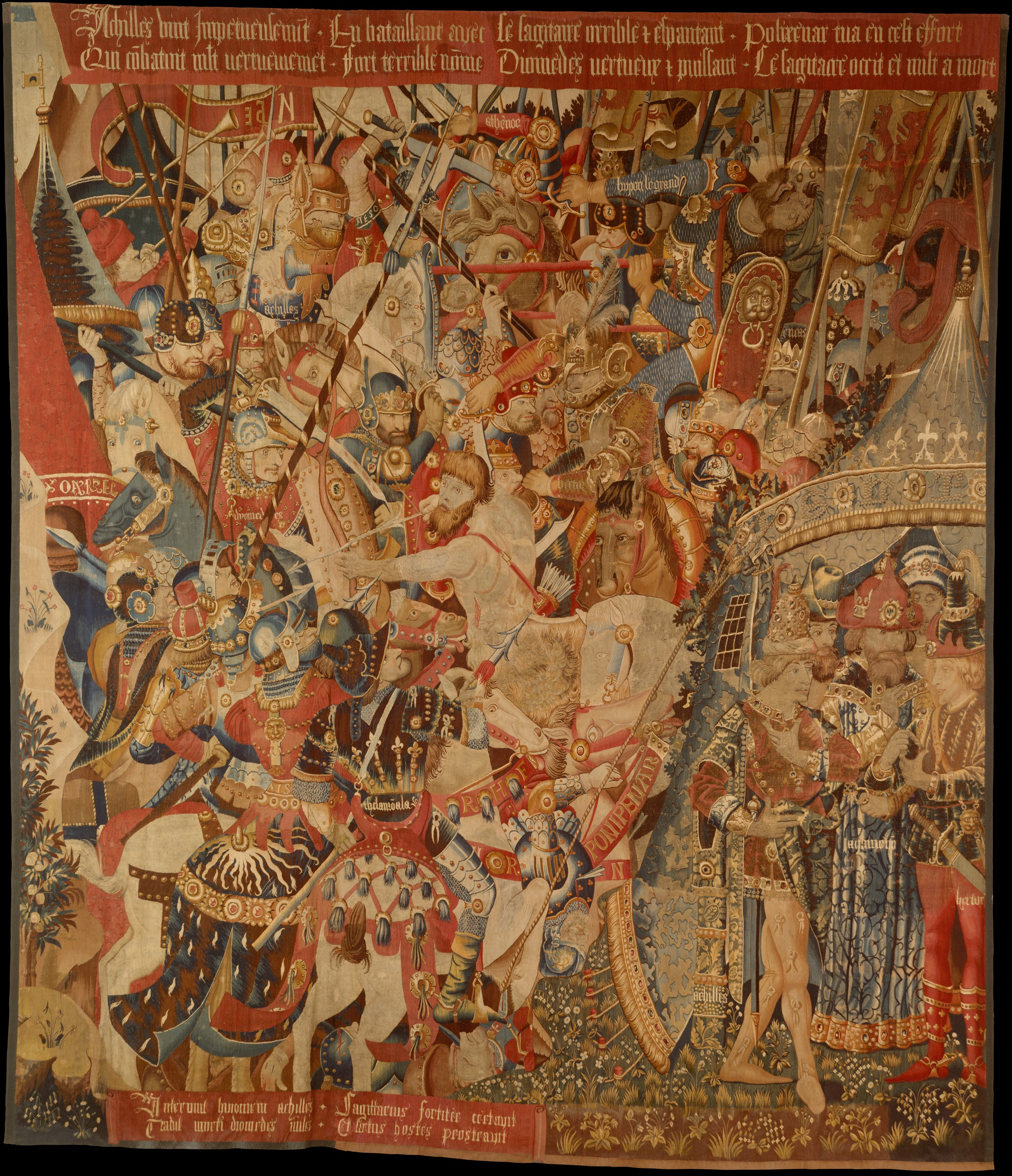
- The Battle with the Sagittary and the Conference at Achilles' Tent (from Scenes from the Story of the Trojan War), probably produced through Jean or Pasquier Grenier, c. 1470–1490
- Died: 21 July 1493; Tournai, Kingdom of France (present-day Belgium)
- Burial place: Church of Saint Quentin, Tournai
- Other names: Pasqiuer Grenier (preferred modern-day form); Pashier Grenier; Passchier Grenier
- Occupations: Tapestry and wine merchant
- Years active: 1447–1493
- Spouse: Marguerite de Lannoy
- Children: 7
- Website: www.metmuseum.org/art/collection/search/468417

Pasquier Grenier (fl. 1447–1493) was a tapestry and wine merchant from the Burgundian South Netherlands, living and working in Tournai, Wallonia. Once believed to be a master tapestry weaver, archival documents reveal that he was actually one of the most prominent tapestry dealers of the fifteenth-century in Western Europe, working with tapestry workshops in cities such as Tournai, Bruges, and Antwerp.

== Life and family ==
Pasquier Grenier was the son of Lottart, but his birth year is undocumented, as neither the primary archival sources nor secondary sources cite a date. What is known is that on 7 July 1447, Pasquier was officially accepted as a burgher of the city of Tournai. At some point (date unknown), he married Marguerite de Lannoy and together they had seven children, who were listed in Pasquier's will including: Gilles, Pierre, Jean, Imbert, Colinet, Antoine (Antonin), and an unnamed daughter married to Corneille Daussat. In addition, Pasquier fathered an illegitimate daughter named Mariette. His sons Pierre and Gilles were both church canons, while Jean and Imbert were noted as being married. Pasquier was a notable and engaged citizen of Tournai and lived in the parish of the Church of Saint Quentin. He was also a member of the noble confraternity of the Damoiseaux (founded in 1280), dedicated to the Virgin Mary.

Pasquier owned several houses in Tournai, located on the "Grand Market," known today as the Grand-Place, and they were adjacent to the Church of Saint Quentin. The house (Note: The house was identified by Crick-Kuntziger as possibly the one called the "Hôtel du Porc" or the "Maison du Porcelet," demolished in the seventeenth century.) was left to his son Jean in his will, along with another house in the city of Bruges. His other son, Imbert, was left a house in the town of Guise in France.

== Career ==
=== Tapestry Merchant ===
Perhaps as early as 1448, Pasquier Grenier is associated with the Truye Brothers, tapestry merchants based in the city of Arras, who named him as their agent in Tournai. Then on 4 February 1449, he is mentioned in archival documents as a Tournai tapestry dealer or merchant (French: "marcheteur") selling his goods to several brokers in different regions of France, including: in 1449, to Pierre Peliche, a merchant in Puy-de-Dôme (in the Auvergne region) and to Jehan Vernie, another merchant in Lyon (in the Auvergne-Rhône-Alpes region). Later, in 1460, he worked with a merchant named Geradin Glaude based in Reims, and to another unnamed merchant in the Champagne region at an unknown date. Archival documents also referred to him as a "tapissier" but scholars have argued based on the extant documentation about him that the term "tapissier" did not mean a tapestry (French: tapisserie) weaver, but one who functioned rather as a supplier or dealer.

On 20 July 1479, he established political and commercial ties to the King of France, Louis XI, through Olivier le Daim, a courtier and advisor to the King, concerning a matter that came before the magistrate of Tournai and documented in the ancient registers of the "Consaux" (the four colleges that made up Tournai's municipal government). Then, another Consaux record dated 29 October 1481 explains that Pasquier served as an ambassador for King Louis XI to the city of Tournai.

In Burgundy (part of modern-day Flanders in Belgium), Pasquier created a subsidiary company based in Bruges, a major port town, allowing him to export his products to the royal courts of England, Italy, and Spain. He also had a showroom filled with an inventory of tapestries in Antwerp, where clients could stop by and purchase an already completed tapestry or set of tapestries (a transaction today referred to as "on spec" meaning the object made was sold on speculation, without a specific buyer) or alternatively the client could order one with him to be woven to their specifications. On 22 September 1486, King Edward IV of England granted Pasquier, his son Jean, and their workers protection and licenses to import tapestries, and other textile objects into England. Two years later, King Edward permitted Jean Pasquier to import into the country, duty free, altar cloths and tapestries of the Trojan Warseries (see below).

=== Wine Merchant ===
Pasquier was registered as a wine dealer in the city of Tournai's registers on 30 December 1483. It is likely that Pasquier became a wine merchant because of his contacts in France, especially Burgundy. However, he was not the first tapestry dealer to also become a wine seller, a career combination seen earlier in the late fourteenth-century and early fifteenth-century in merchants from the city of Arras, such as Jean (Jehan) Cosset and Hugues (Huart) Walois who sold both wine and tapestries.

== Documented tapestry sales to royal clients ==
Archival documents, gathered in various secondary sources, shed more specific information on his career, including that Pasquier Grenier sold several sumptuous tapestry sets to Philip the Bold, the Duke of Burgundy as early at 1454–1455. He was also the most important supplier of tapestries to later dukes of Burgundy, including Philip the Good and Charles the Bold. Documented sales of tapestries (or sets of specific tapestry series) by Pasquier Grenier include the following:

=== The Story of Alexander the Great ===
- One set (6 tapestry wall panels, along with a "chambre" of tapestries set for the bed) sold in August 1459 to Philip the Good, the Duke of Burgundy. The archival record states this tapestry set was made with wool, silk, and metallic (gold and silver) threads and the panels were very large in dimension (seven hundred and eight three-quarter ells), and cost the Duke 5,000 écus d'or (a type of gold French coinage).
- Another set was possibly sold also in 1459, but it is not certain, to the Duke of Milan, Francesco Sforza, after Pasquier's son, Melchior, and Guillaume (Note: It remains unclear who Guillaume Grenier and how he was related to Pasquier Grenier. Some scholars have identified him as his nephew, as he was the son of a deceased man named Johannes (Jean) Grenier.) went to Milan in January 1459 to show the designs for the set to Francesco Sforza. Two pieces survive, likely from this set (or possibly the one purchased by Philip the Good), and are located in the collection of the Doria Pamphilj Gallery in Rome, having been part of the collection of the Doria family of Genoa.
- Another set was sold in 1467–1468 to King Edward IV of England.

=== The Story of the Trojan War ===
- A series of payments are recorded from 1472 to 1476 from the city of Bruges, as well as the by the Franc of Bruge, for a set of eleven tapestries that were given as a gift to Charles the Bold, Duke of Burgundy.
- On 13 July 1476, Jean (Pasquier's son) received a third of the payment (recorded in a notarial document) for a set of eleven tapestries to the Duke of Urbino, Federico da Montefeltro. In February 1490, the set of tapestries were loaned for the wedding festivities of Francesco II Gonzaga, Marquess of Mantua to Isabella d'Este that took place in Mantua.
- Another eleven-piece set sold to Henry VII of England before 13 March 1488 where in a letter the English king told Richard Foxe, the Bishop of Exeter, of his purchase from Pasquier's son, Jean. Five of these tapestries were hanging on the walls of the Painted Chamber in the Palace of Westminster in 1779 and were recorded by John Carter in watercolor sketches now housed at the Victoria and Albert Museum. One tapestry survives from this set is also at the Victoria and Albert Museum, along with its cartoon at the Louvre Museum. Other extant fragments of this set are located at The Metropolitan Museum of Art and at the Museum of Fine Arts, Boston.
- The series was also sold to King Charles VIII of France around 1492-1493 and was again documented in the King's inventory of 1494-95 since the king had his emblem woven into the 11 tapestries of this set that he owned.
- King Ferdinand I of Naples purchased a set before 1487 and many scholars believe four panels, likely from this set, survive in the collection of the Cathedral of Zamora.
- Further owners of this set, which were based on the same cartoons owned by Pasquier Grenier, include:
  - Matthias Corvinus, King of Hungary and Croatia purchased a set in 1495.
  - King James IV of Scotland owned at set in 1503.
  - Íñigo López de Mendoza y Quiñones, 1st Marquess of Mondéjar also owned a set (date unknown).

=== The Story of the Passion of Christ ===
- Six-panel set of tapestries were sold in 1461 to Philip the Good, the Duke of Burgundy, for 4,000 écus d'or. Two tapestries from this set survive in the collections of the Vatican Museums in Rome and the Royal Museums of Fine Arts of Belgium in Brussels.
- Another set was sold in 1467–1468 to King Edward IV of England. This set of tapestries were made with metallic threads (gold and silver) and the panels were very large in dimension.

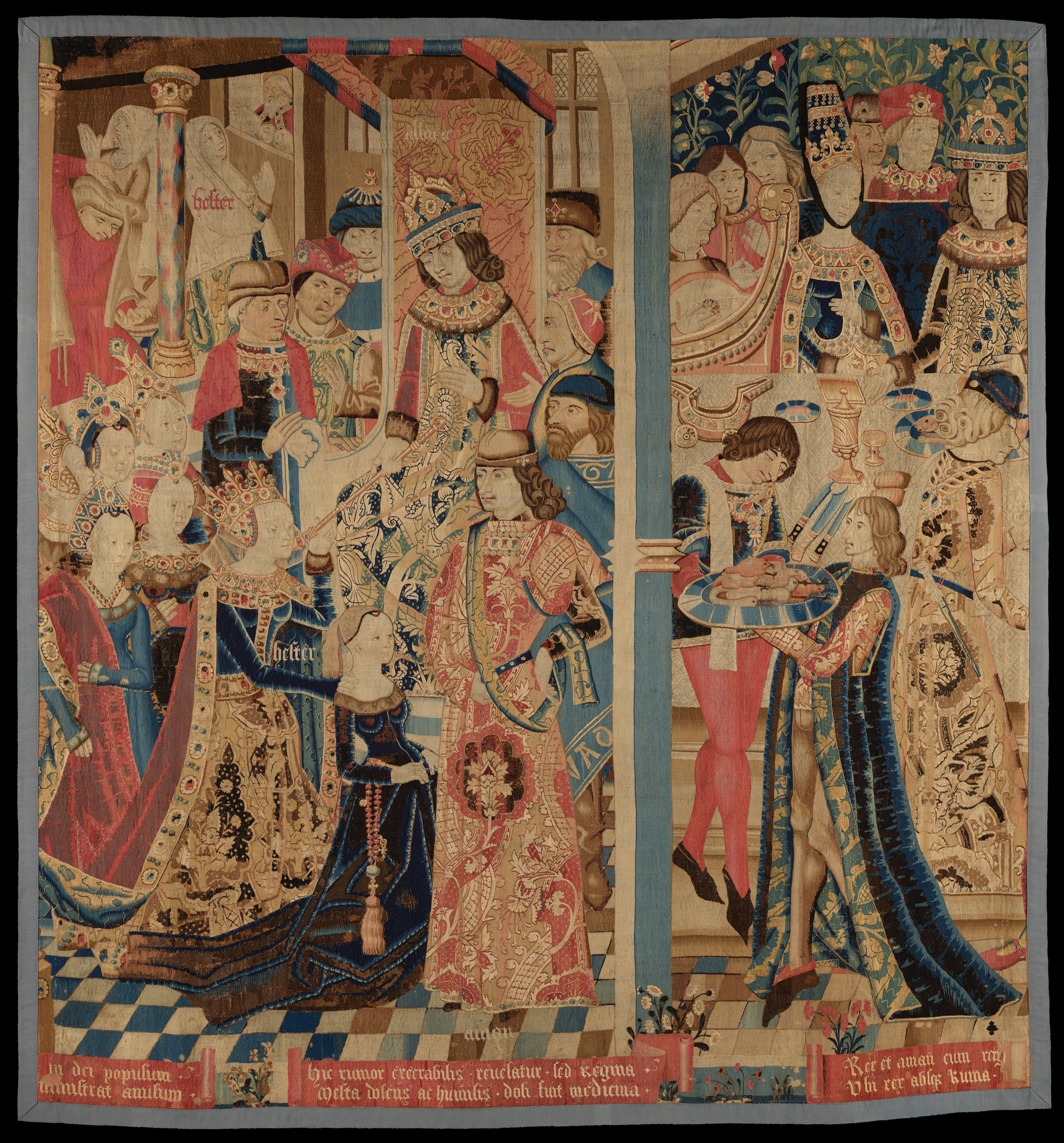
Esther and Ahasuerus, c. 1460–1485, Flanders, wool and silk, 134 3/4 in. x 128 in. (342.27 cm. x 325.12 cm), Minneapolis Institute of Art, Accession No. 16.721

=== The Story of Esther and Ahasuerus ===
- A six-panel tapestry set was sold in 1461–1462 to Philip the Good, the Duke of Burgundy. Like the Swan Knight below, the set was offered as a gift to the Cardinal of Arras, Jean Jouffroy. Several fragments from this series survive among three collections, though it is not certain if they are from the set that Pasquier Grenier sold to the Duke. Two tapestries are located at the Musée Lorrain in Nancy, another at the Minneapolis Institute of Arts and a fragment at the Louvre Museum.

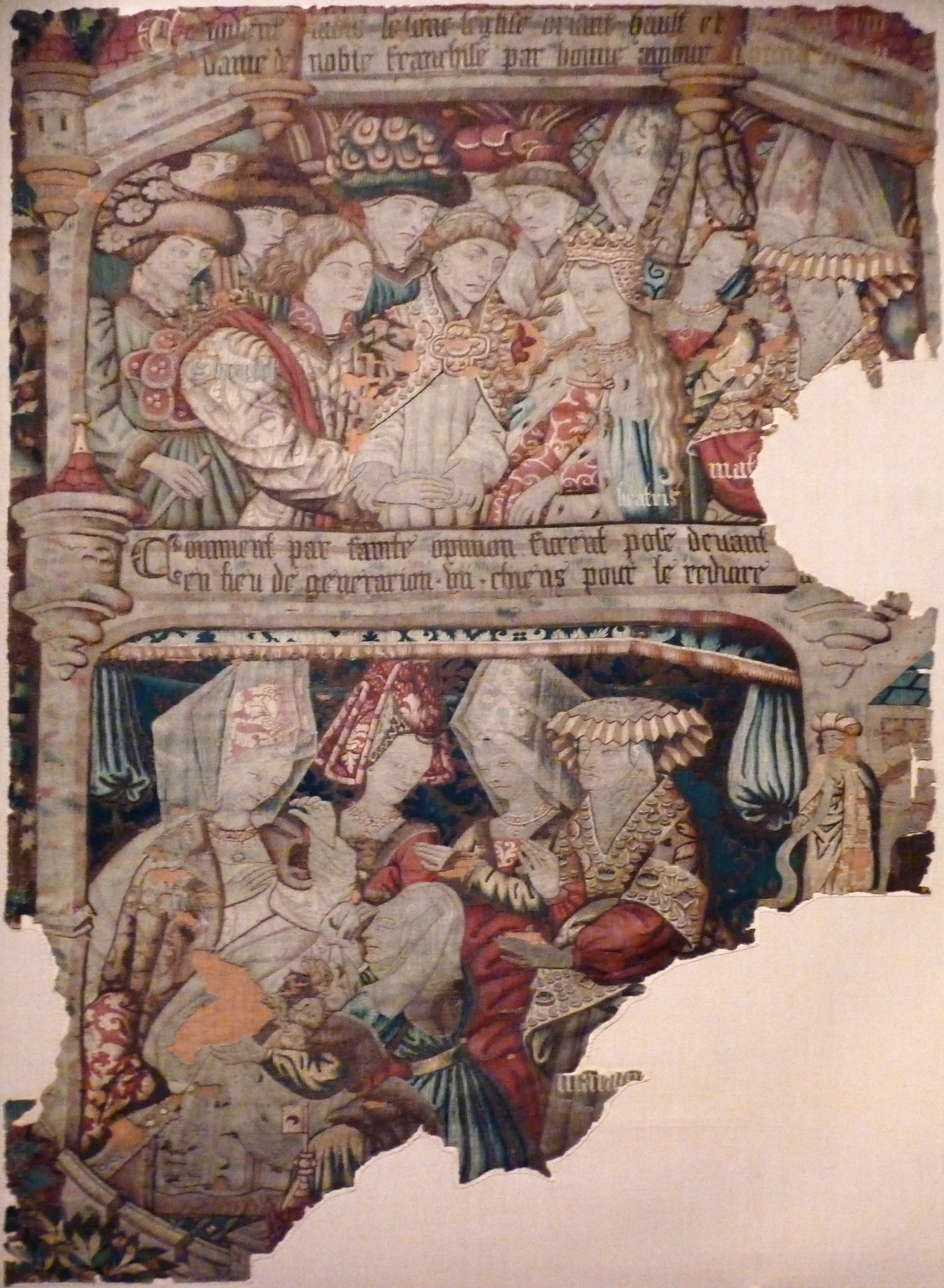
Tapestry fragment from the Swan Knight, ca. 1462, Tournai. Wool, silk, and metal threads. 356 cm. x 224 cm. Vienna, Museum of Applied Arts (MAK), Inv. No. T 8211.

=== The Story of the Swan Knight (Knight of the Swan) ===
- A three-piece set was sold in 1461–1462 to the Duke of Burgundy, Philip the Good. The set was a gift to the Cardinal of Arras, Jean Jouffroy, similar to the tapestry set above that illustrates the Story of Esther and Ahasuerus. Fragments from this set survive at the Museum of Applied Arts (MAK) in Vienna (Inv. No. T 8211) and also in the tapestry collection at the Wawel Royal Castle in Cracow.

=== Orange Pickers ===
- One panel was sold in 1461 to the Duke of Burgundy, Philip the Good. In 1466, the Duke bought an entire suite (French: chambre) of tapestries with orange trees that included four wall panels, a bedcover, and a bench cover as a gift for his sister, Agnes of Burgundy, Duchess of Bourbon.

=== Woodcutters ===
- One set was sold in 1461 to the Duke of Burgundy, Philip the Good, that comprised a suite (French: chambre) of nine tapestries including cushions and covers for the bed, along with four panels for the walls, all made out of linen and silk. Then again in 1466, the Duke of Burgundy, Philip the Good purchased another suite for his niece, Catherine of Bourbon, duchess of Guelders.
- In 1505, Pasquier's son, Jean, sold another set (probably based on the same cartoons as the earlier sets) to Philip the Handsome, Duke of Burgundy.

=== The Story of Nebuchadnezzar ===
- A set was sold in 1467–1468 to King Edward IV of England.

== Attributed tapestry sales to royal clients ==
Some tapestry sales do not have archival documentation, but based on stylistic affinities with those surviving tapestries listed above, scholars have proposed that the following set of tapestries was a possible sale of Pasquier Grenier:

=== Pastrana Tapestries ===
- Attributed sale made by Pasquier Grenier: this set of tapestries celebrates the 1471 Portuguese conquest of the Moroccan cities of Asilah and Tangier. The set of four tapestries was woven for Afonso V, King of Portugal, in the 1470s. In 1664, Fray Pedro da Silva e Mendonça (c. 1563), the son of Ruy Gómez de Silva, 1st Prince of Ébolidonated the works to the Collegiate Church (Spanish: Sacristía Mayor de la Colegiata) in Pastrana, Spain, which is now the Parish Museum (Spanish: El Museo Parroquial) and where the tapestries are housed today.

=== Heraldic of tapestry John Dynham, 1st Baron of Dynham ===
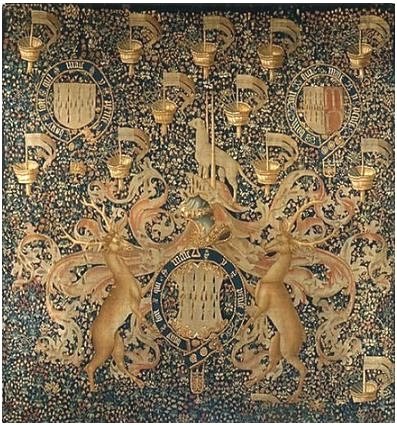
Tapestry with the Armorial Bearings and Badges of John Dynham, 1st Baron of Dynham, c.1487-1501, Southern Netherlands, wool and silk, 12 ft. 8 in. x 12 ft. 1 in., inv. no. 60.127.1, The Cloisters Collection, The Metropolitan Museum of Art, New York.

- Attributed sale made by either or both Pasquier Grenier and his son Jean: this single-paneled tapestry is filled with the full achievement, complete with armorial bearings and heraldic badges of John Dynham, 1st Baron of Dynham and is located in The Cloisters Collection at The Metropolitan Museum of Art.

== Patronage at the Church of Saint Quentin ==
=== Architectural ===
From the archival sources, scholars deduce that Pasquier Grenier accumulated significant wealth and status. He became a patron of the Church of Saint Quentin, Tournai as early as 1464 or 1469, (Note: The date remains unclear because of an error made by earlier transcribers of the fifteenth-century letter, thus exact original date is unknown.) he provided the funds for the renovation of the east end (chevet) of the Church of Saint Quentin, including the addition of an ambulatory, eight new columns that supported the vaults of the choir, and three new chapels. The central chapel (axial chapel) of the three was dedicated to the Seven Sacraments and later housed the sepulcher of Pasquier and his wife, Marguerite de Lannoy. Pasquier paid in perpetuity for masses to be said in the family's honor four times a week. Later, in 1519, Pasquier's son stipulated in his will that he too was to be buried in the same family chapel.

=== Wall painting and tapestry ===
In addition to paying for the structural changes and additions to the church that were completed by October 1474, Pasquier paid for frescoed wall paintings that were executed between 1474 and 1493, and made with tempera for the axial chapel's ceiling vaults. In the vaults, the painting's imagery includes angels, the Four Evangelists (Matthew, Mark, Luke and John), chalices (or ciborium), Eucharistic hosts, and banderoles with text. In the center of the keystone vault, Pasquier had a painted sculpture created that includes an angel supporting his coat of arms, but it was over-painted in the nineteenth century, thus the image is not an accurate representation of his crest.

Sometime between 1464 or 1469 and 1474, Pasquier Grenier and Marguerite de Lannoy donated a set of seven tapestries of the Seven Sacraments to the Church of Saint Quentin that were in turn hung in the choir of the church. Fragments that survive possibly from Pasquier's set (or more likely a related set that was woven from the same cartoons as those donated to the Church of Saint Quentin by Pasquier) are located in the collections of the Metropolitan Museum of Art, the Victoria and Albert Museum, and the Burrell Collection. Scholars argue that the imagery of the panel in Glasgow includes donor portraits of Pasquier Grenier and his wife, Marguerite de Lannoy, along with their children, but other scholars like Adolph Cavallo doubt this represents the family.

== Death and legacy ==
His testament is dated 13 July 1493 and was entered into record on 24 July 1493. (Note: Eugène Soil de Moriamé misdated it as 1494 instead of 1493.) It is believed that he died on 21 July 1493. His testament outlined the division of his property among his survivors, including many tapestry models and "cartoons" (French: "patrons") that he specifically left to be "equally divided" among "my children": Jean, Imbert, Colinet, and Antoine. No tapestries were bequeathed in his testament, leaving scholar Guy Delmarcel to deduce that Pasqiuer was indeed a tapestry merchant in that he was essentially a financier who owned the copyright to his models, cartoons, and designs, and he would have likely subcontracted these out to different workshops and weavers who would in turn manufacture the tapestries to be sold on spec or made on the request of a specific patron. Further evidence supports the argument that Pasquier was more of a merchant and agent than a workshop owner, as he did not own any low-warp looms or high-warp looms upon his death, nor did he have any stock of wool.

Two of Pasquier's sons remained involved with the family business as tapestry dealers after their father's death: Jean (d. Feb. 1519) and Antoine. They both continued to sell tapestries till around 1520 to the leading noble families of Europe, including clients such as King Henry VII of England, Philip the Handsome, the Duke of Burgundy, and the Archbishop of Rouen, Georges d'Amboise. In 1497, Antoine Grenier sold Georges d'Amboise a tapestry altar frontal to be displayed in the Archiepiscopal Palace in Rouen, and then in 1508, Antoine sold him other tapestries for his summer archiepiscopal residence, the Château de Gaillon.
