= Grand-Place, Tournai =

Square in Tournai, Belgium

Grand-Place
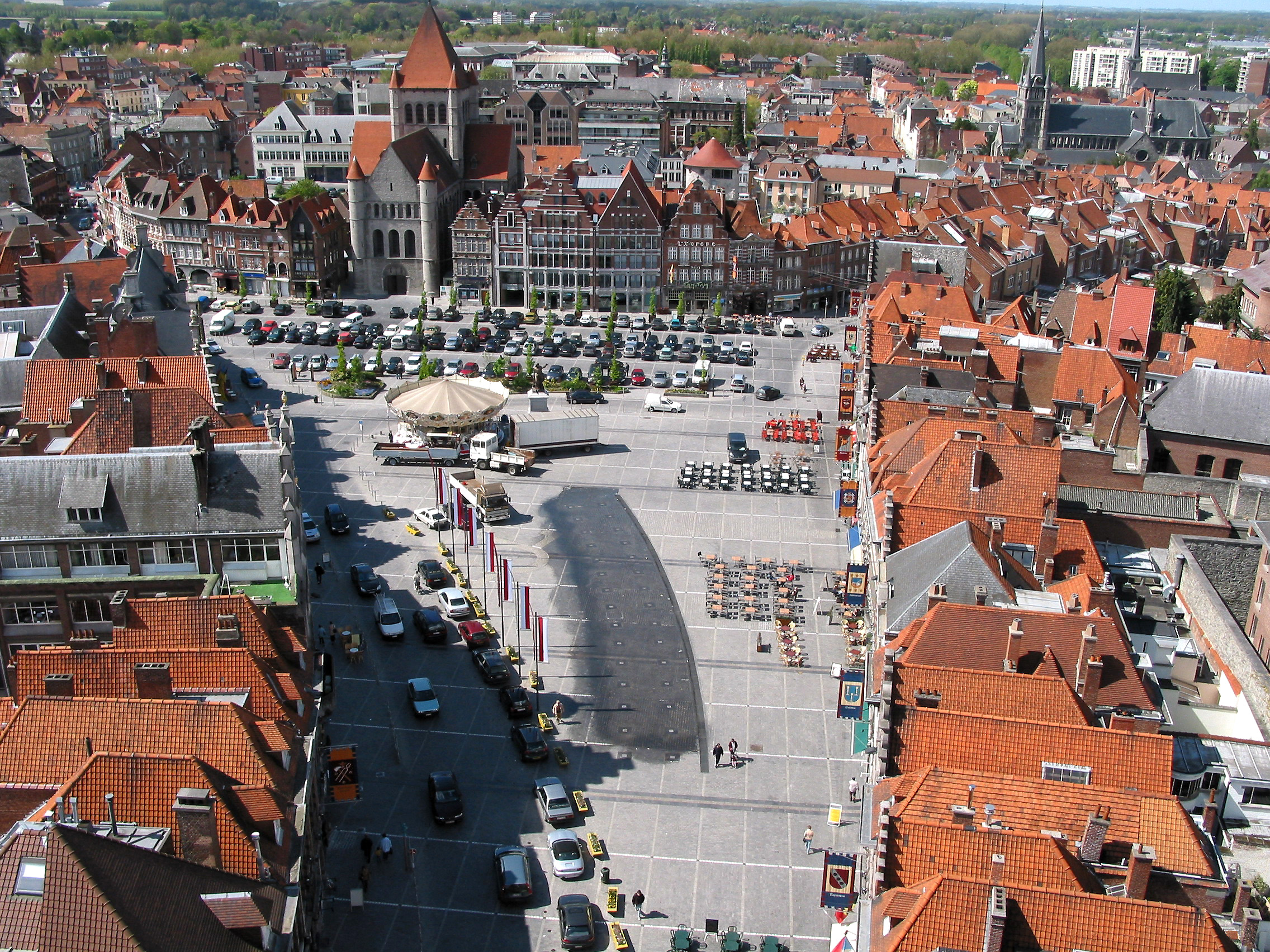
- View of Tournai's Grand-Place from its Belfry

- Location within Belgium
- Location: Tournai, Hainaut, Belgium
- Coordinates: 50°36′23″N 3°23′11″E

The Grand-Place (French: [ɡʁɑ̃ plas]; "Grand Square" (Note: In this case, the French word place is a "false friend", and the correct counterparts in English are "plaza" or "town square".)) is the main square and the centre of activity of Tournai, Hainaut, Belgium. The square has a triangular shape, owing it to the convergence of several ancient roads, and it covers 7,500 m^{2} (81,000 sq ft).

As in many Belgian cities, there are a number of cafés and pubs on the Grand-Place. In the middle of the square there are a series of water fountains, while a circular staircase to the top of the city's Belfry can be climbed.

== History ==
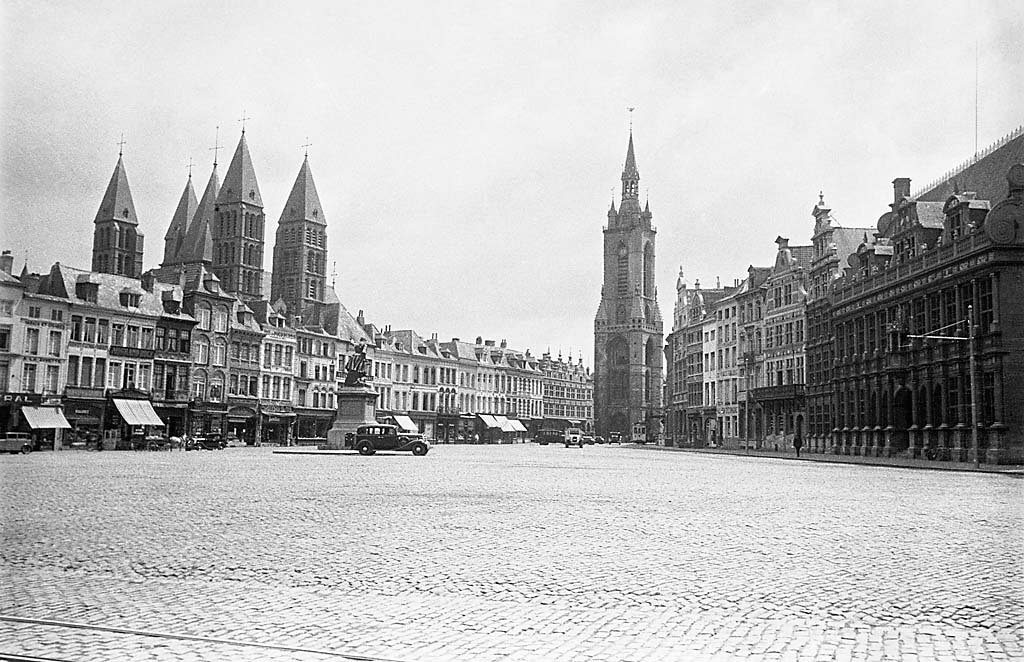
The Grand-Place, c. 1934

The unusual triangular shape of the Grand-Place is due to the convergence of several ancient roads. Originally located outside the first city walls, this vast area was used as a cemetery in its western part, from the 1st to the 4th century AD.

During the Carolingian era, with the resumption of large-scale trade in Western Europe, the long-abandoned cemetery was transformed into a marketplace. The economic importance of this market attracted large crowds. In 1187, when the town received its own charter guaranteeing it municipal freedoms from King Philippe Auguste of France, the residents of Tournai chose the Grand-Place to erect a belfry, a symbol of these hard-won freedoms. From then on, the square became the centre of community life.

On 16–17 May 1940, almost all the buildings in the centre of Tournai, including the Grand-Place, were destroyed by German bombs. They were rebuilt between the 1940s and the beginning of the 2000s, most of them in a historicist style.

== Buildings ==
- The Belfry of Tournai, a freestanding bell tower of medieval origin, 72 metres (236 ft) in height with a 256-step stairway. Since 2005, it is recognised as a World Heritage Site by UNESCO, as part of the bi-national inscription "Belfries of Belgium and France" in recognition of its architecture and importance in the history of municipal power in Europe.
- The Cloth Hall, a building originally constructed in 1610 in Renaissance style to replace a first 13th-century wooden hall. It was rebuilt identically in 1881 following its collapse.
- The Church of St. Quentin, a Catholic parish church in Romanesque style with Gothic elements, known to have existed since the 10th century. The current building was built around 1200, but has been altered several times throughout history. It contains important sculptures by the 15th-century sculptor Jean Delemer.
- The Princess of Epinoy statue, a bronze statue made in 1863 by the sculptor Aimable Dutrieux in honour of Marie-Christine de Lalaing, who defended the city against Alexander Farnese, Duke of Parma, in 1581.

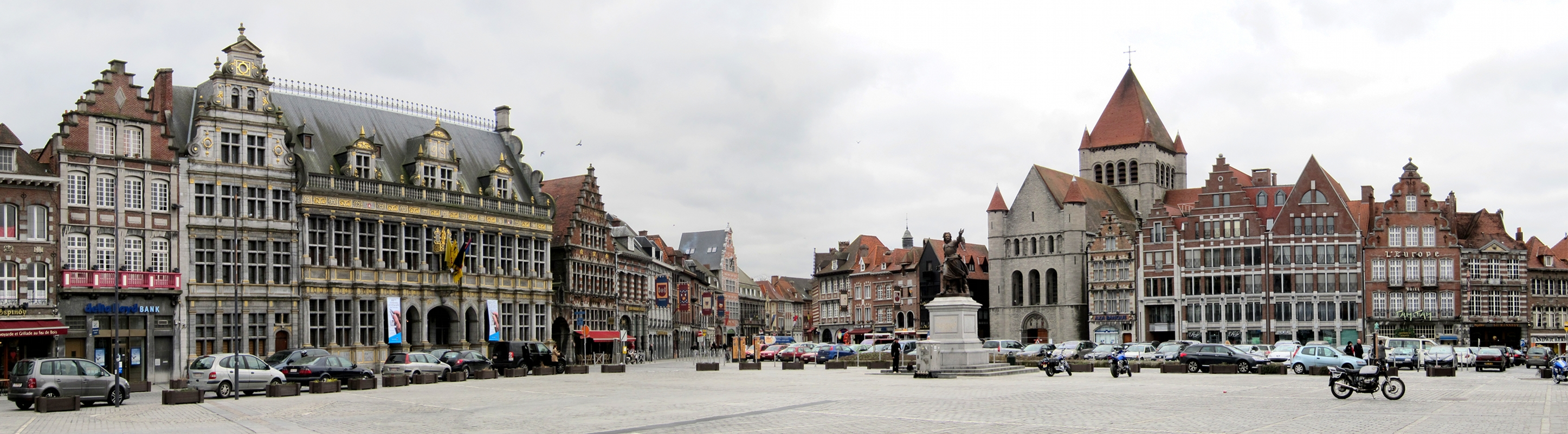
Panoramic view of the Grand-Place. From left to right: the Cloth Hall, the Rue des Maux, the Princess of Epinoy statue and the Church of St. Quentin.
