= Rumillies =

Village in Hainaut, Belgium

Coordinates: 50°37′N 3°27′E

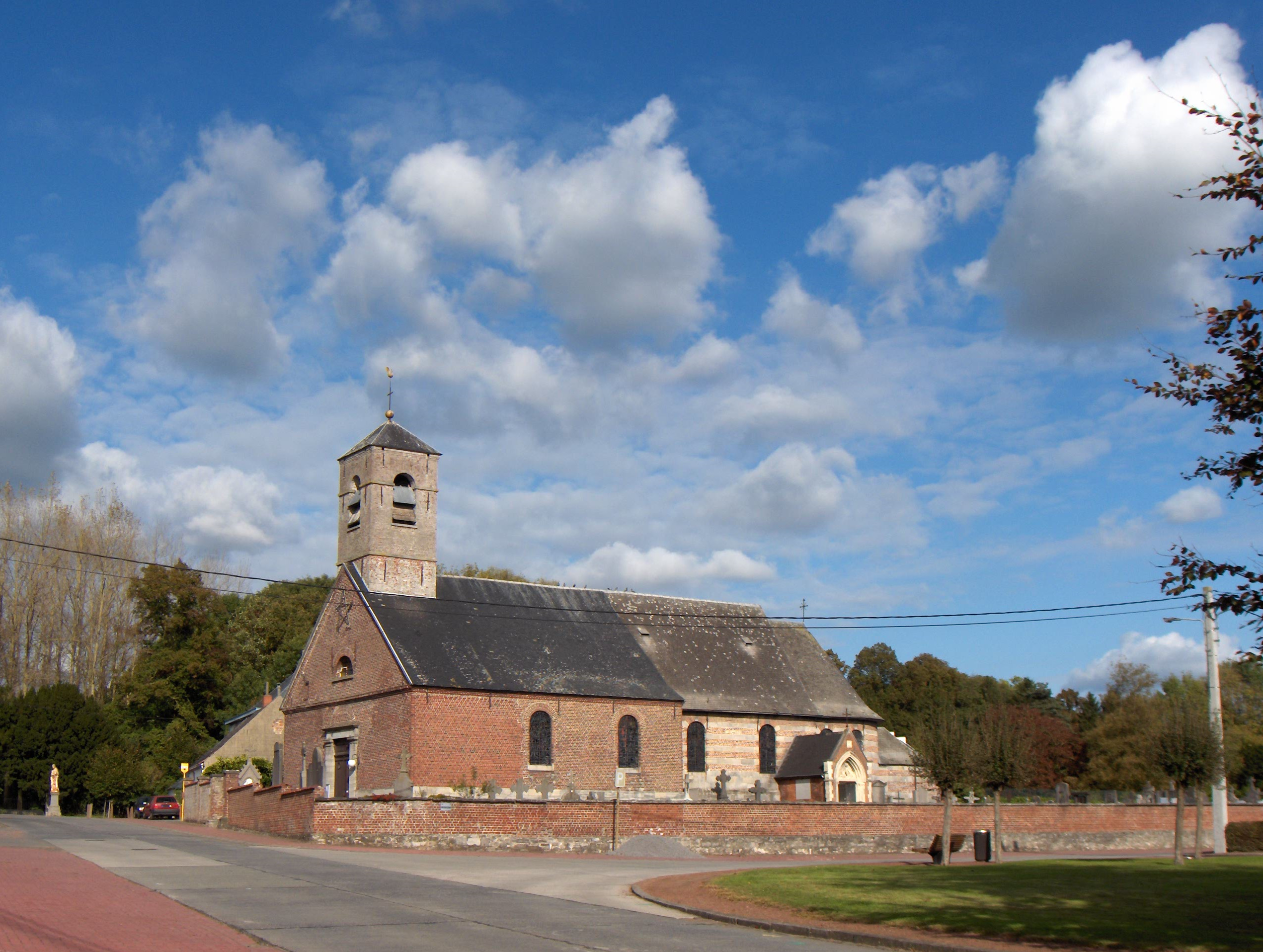
Saint-Maria-Magdalenachurch

Rumillies (Picard: Rumilie) is a village of Wallonia and a district of the municipality of Tournai, located in the province of Hainaut, Belgium.

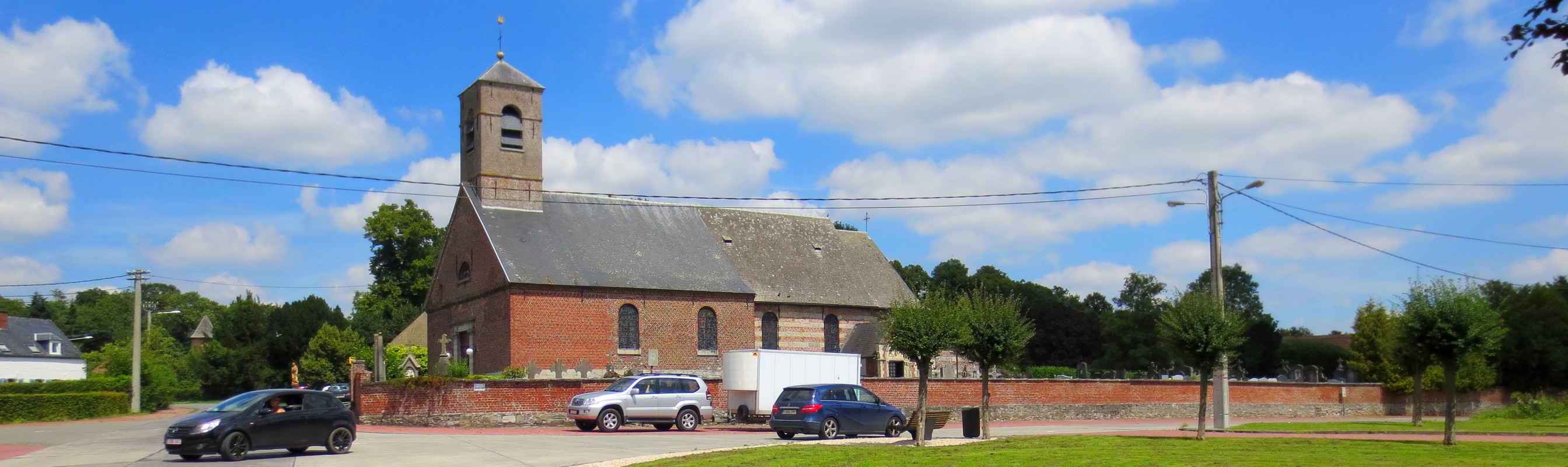
Rumillies
