= Church of Saint Quentin, Tournai =

Roman Catholic church in Wallonia, Belgium

Coordinates: 50°36′24″N 03°23′06″E

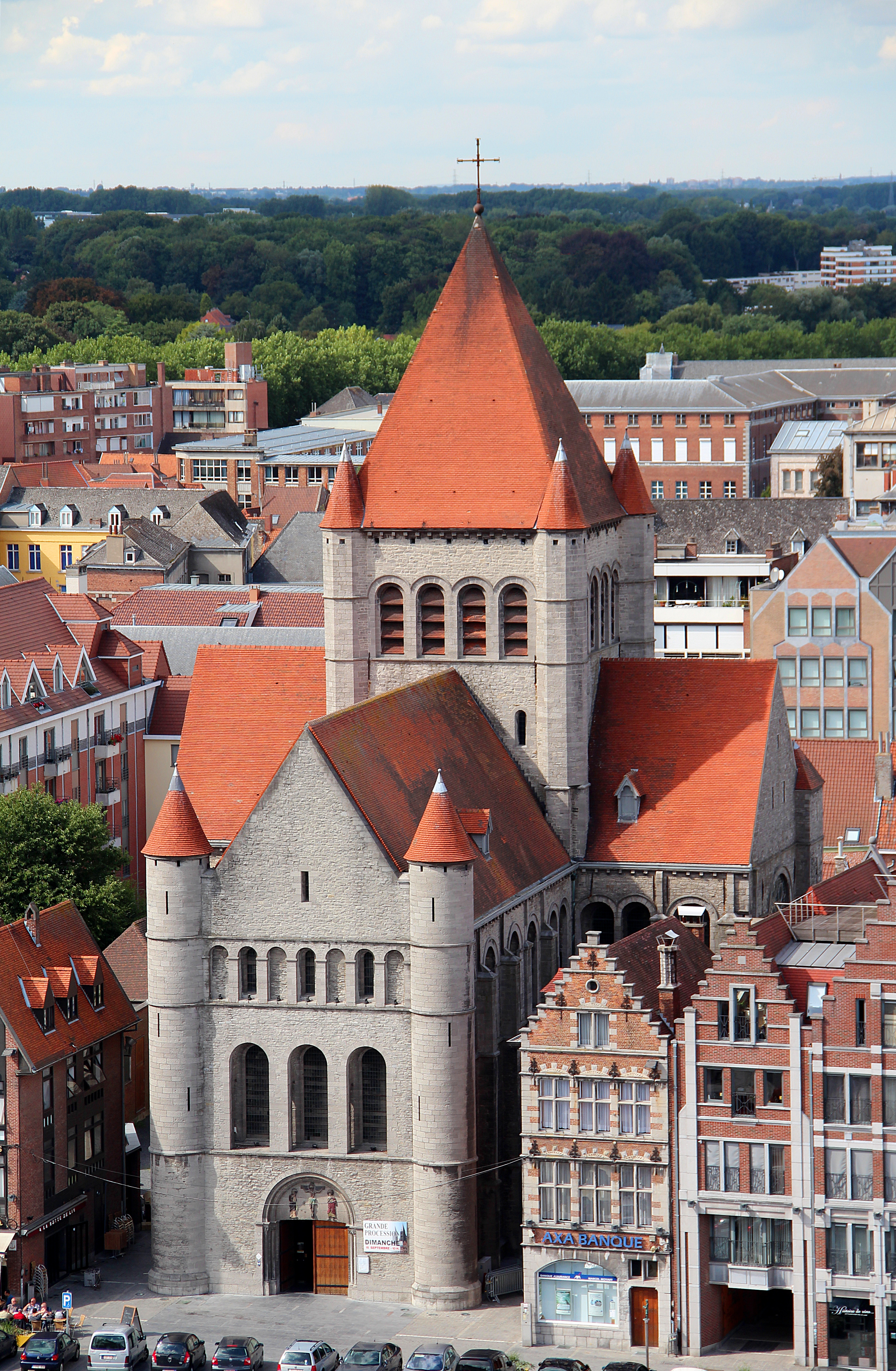
Church of Saint Quentin, Tournai

The Church of St. Quentin (French: Église Saint-Quentin) is a Roman Catholic parish church in Tournai, Belgium. The largely Romanesque building is located on the main square of the town, the Grand-Place.

Known to have existed since the 10th century, the current building was built around 1200, but has been altered several times throughout history. In the late 15th century, a major reconstruction effort altered the chancel, created an ambulatory and replaced earlier side chapels. This reconstruction was partially financed by tapestry maker Pasquier Grenier and his wife Marguerite de Lannoye, who were also buried in one of the chapels.

During World War II, the church was heavily damaged by German bombing in 1940 and subsequently reconstructed after the war. It opened again in 1968. The current facade and tower are reconstructions from this period. Inside, the church contains two Late Gothic wooden sculptures, made by Jean Delemer and painted by Robert Campin and dated to 1428. They are of art historical interest as early examples of such Late Gothic sculpture.

== History ==
The church is mentioned for the first time in written sources during the 10th century. It is located at the far end of the Grand-Place, where a large Gallo-Roman cemetery was once located. The current building dates from c. 1200, and was built in a Romanesque style. It originally consisted of a nave, a transept and a chancel with four side chapels. The lowest windows were set in deep arcades, while the windows higher up were incorporated into a gallery running around the entire church facade. In the first building, only some of the chapels were vaulted.

The church has however been altered several times. Already in the 13th century, the chancel and the transept arms were vaulted. In the 1460s, the chancel was remade. The side chapels were changed into an ambulatory with three projecting chapels. The chancel was separated from the ambulatory by arcades. This reconstruction, made in a Flamboyant Gothic style, was partially financed by the wealthy tapestry maker Pasquier Grenier and his wife Marguerite de Lannoye, who were also buried in the central chapel. Among the murals that decorate the chapel vaults, their coat of arms can still be discerned. Grenier also donated seven tapestries to the church, displaying the seven sacraments. They were later dispersed and entered the collections of the Metropolitan Museum of Art, New York, the Victoria and Albert Museum, London and the Burrell Collection, Glasgow.

Further changes were made to the church during the 19th century, by architect Bruno Renard. In the early 20th century restoration works were carried out by architects Constant Sonneville and François Ladavid. During World War II, the church was heavily damaged by German bombing in 1940. Restoration works continued until 1968, when the church was again opened for service.

== Description ==
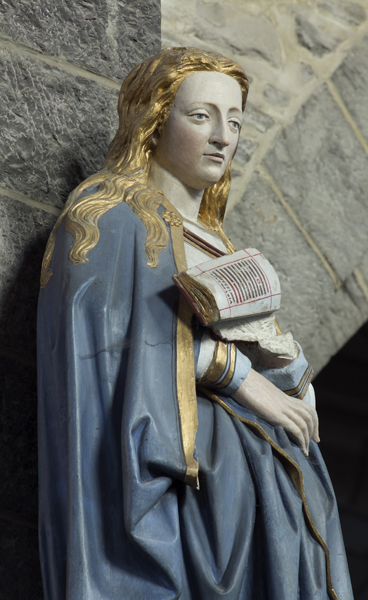
One of the two sculptures by Jean Delemer (1428)

The current facade is a reconstruction from the 1960s. Inside, a nave four bays long ends in a large crossing, supporting a square tower which the medieval building probably never had; it is also from the 1960s. The chancel, described above, is two bays long, and the transept arms also consist of two bays of unequal length. With the exception of the nave and the crossing, the entire church has rib vaults.

The church contains two wooden sculptures depicting the Annunciation made by Jean Delemer and painted by Robert Campin. They were made in 1428, while the colours and the heads of the sculptures have been restored in more recent times. The group, which shows clear influences from contemporary painting, is significant as "the earliest example of the Late Gothic style that was to dominate the sculpture of the Netherlands and most of Europe for the following century." They were originally made for another church in Tournai, dedicated to Saint Peter, but since 2010 they have been displayed in Saint Quentin.
