= Marc Quaghebeur =

Belgian poet and essayist

Marc Quaghebeur (born Tournai, 1947) is a Belgian poet and essayist. He is director of the Archives and Museum of Literature in Brussels. He has a truly Belgian surname. It derives from Dutch Kwagebeur and has been adapted to the French spelling tradition.

== Bibliography ==
Essays

- 1982 : Balises pour l’histoire de nos lettres, Brussels, Promotion des Lettres.
- 1990 : Lettres belges. Entre absence et magie, Labor
- 1990 : Un pays d'irréguliers Labor. Collaboration de Jean-Pierre Verheggen et V. Jago-Antoine
- 1990 : Vivre à la mort, parler, n'être rien, être personne. Une lecture de "Oui" de Thomas Bernhard, Actes Sud
- 1993 : Belgique : la première des littératures francophones non françaises, Akademisk forlag
- 1998 : Balises pour l'histoire des lettres belges, Labor. Postface de Paul Aron
- 2006 : Anthologie de la littérature française de Belgique : entre réel et surréel, Racine
- 2015 : Histoire Forme et Sens en Littérature. La Belgique francophone. Tome 1 : L'engendrement (1815/1914), Peter Lang
- 2017 : Histoire Forme et Sens en Littérature. La Belgique francophone. Tome 2 : L'ébranlement (1914/1944), Peter Lang

Poetry

- 1976 : Forclaz, P-J. Oswald
- 1979 : Le Cycle de la morte. 1. L'Herbe seule, L'Âge d'homme
- 1983 : Le Cycle de la morte. 2. Chiennelures, Fata Morgana
- 1987 : Le Cycle de la morte. 3. L'Outrage, Fata Morgana
- 1989 : Le Cycle de la morte. 4. Oiseaux, Jacques Antoine éditeur
- 1990 : Le Cycle de la morte. 5. À la morte, Fata Morgana
- 1991 : Les Vieilles, Tétras Lyre
- 1993 : Les Carmes du Saulchoir, L’Ether vague
- 1994 : Fins de siècle, La Maison de la poésie de Amay
- 1994 : L'Effroi l'errance, Tétras Lyre
- 1999 : La Nuit de Yuste, Le Cormier
- 2006 : Clairs obscurs : petites proses, Le Temps qu'il fait

Novels

- 2012 : Les Grands Masques, La Renaissance du livre
