= Jean Delemer =

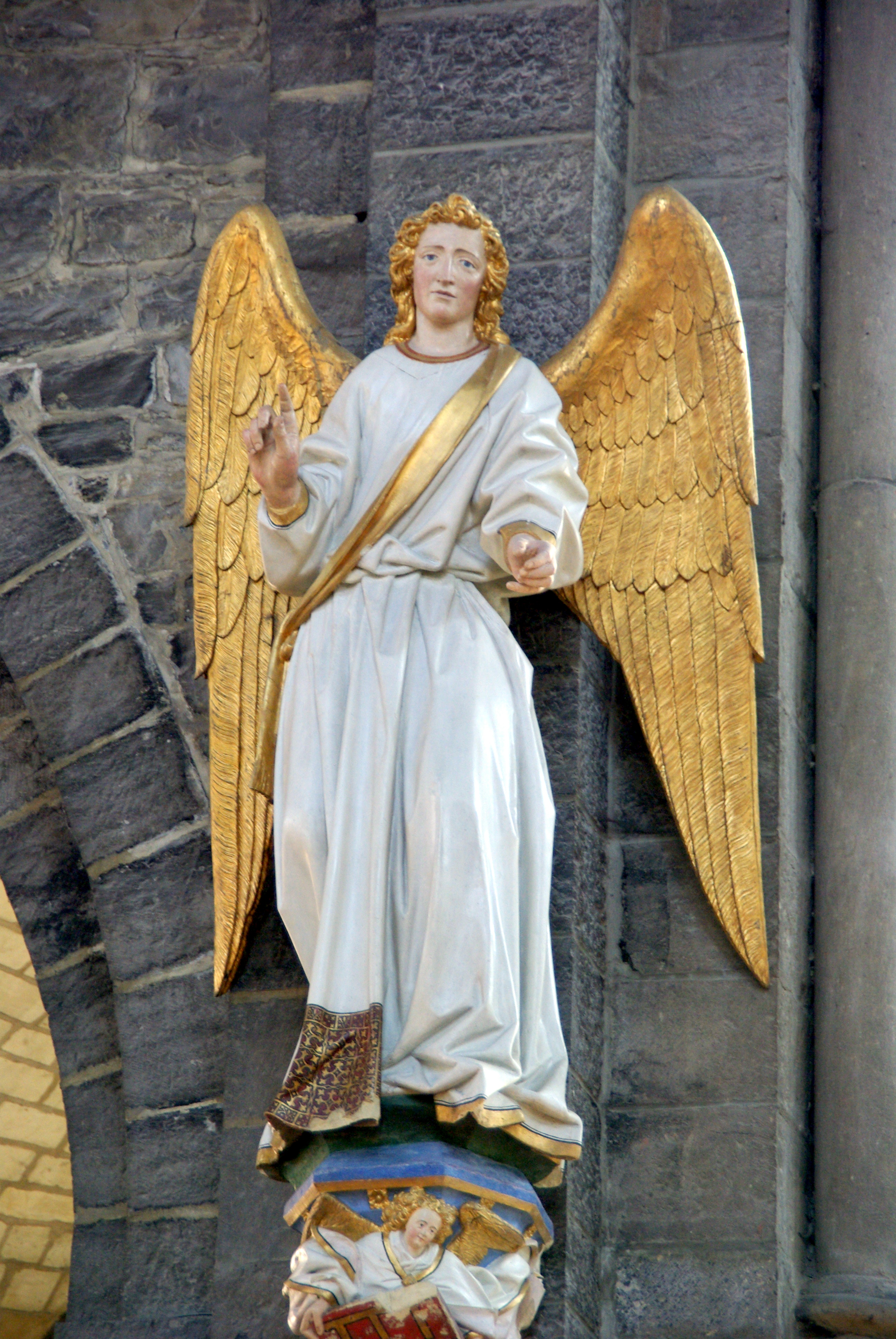
Angel Gabriel installed in the Church of Saint Quentin in Tournai

Jean Delemer (1410 – 1440), was a Flemish sculptor.

== Biography ==
He was active in Tournai from 1428 to 1440 and was possibly from Valenciennes. He was probably born in the 1410s as he was paid in 1428 for carving a life-size stone Annunciation group after a painting by Robert Campin for what is now the Church of Saint Quentin in Tournai. His Annunciation group is considered the earliest example of the Late Gothic style. Besides this group, no other works by the sculptor are known.

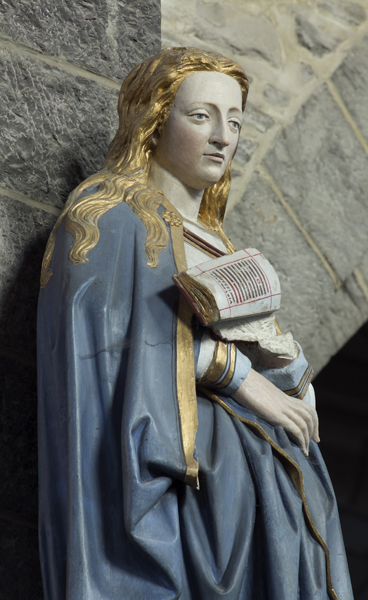
Tournai

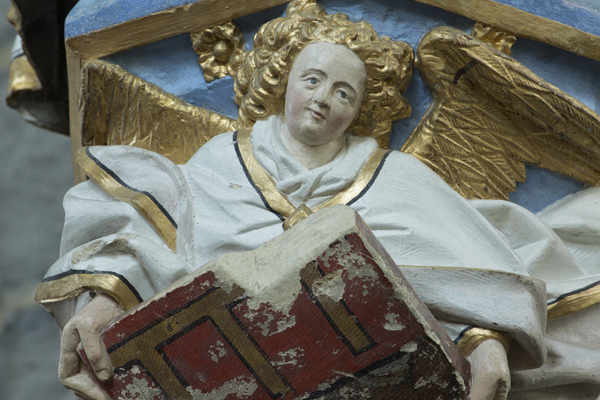
Tournai

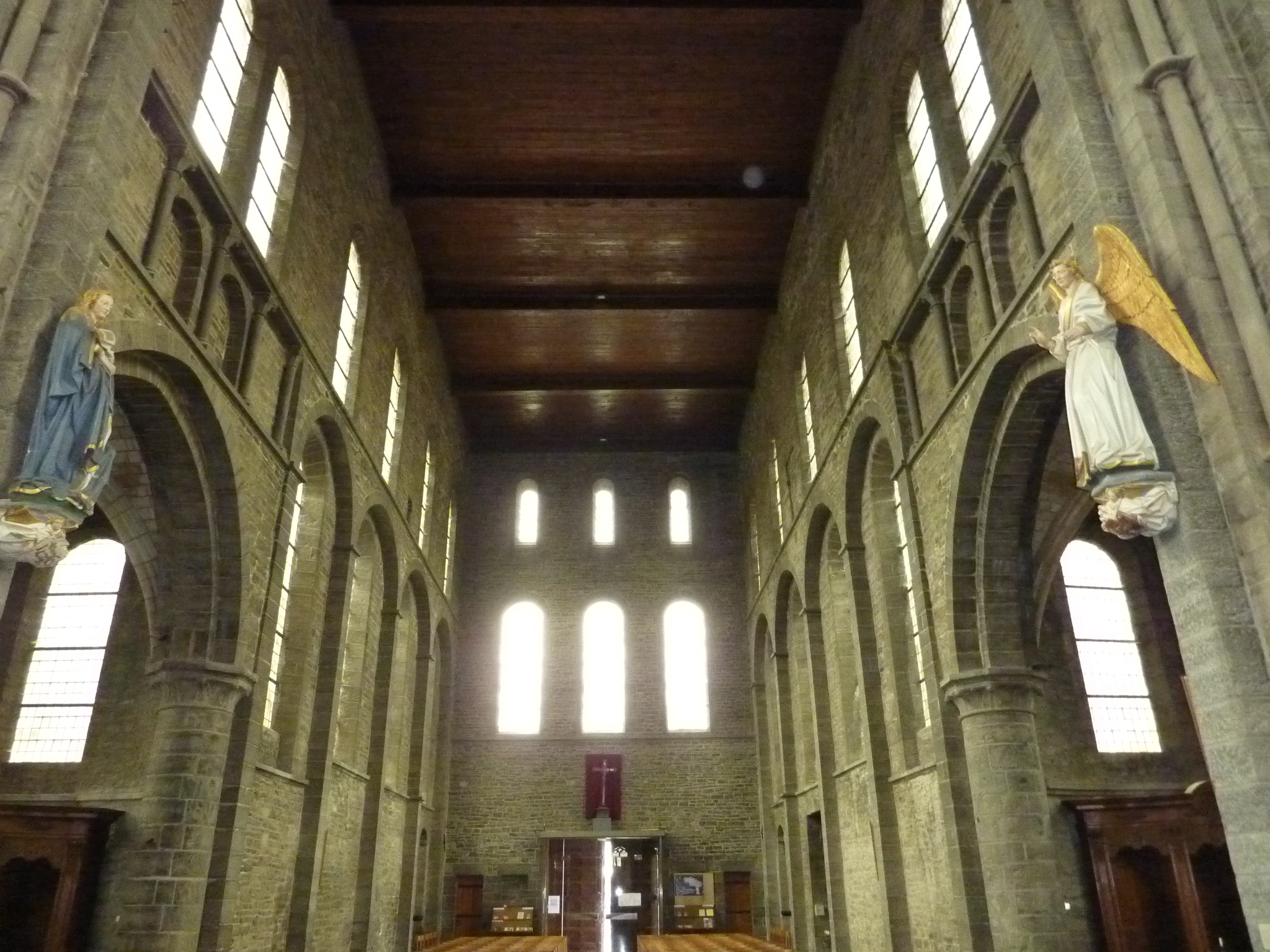
Tournai

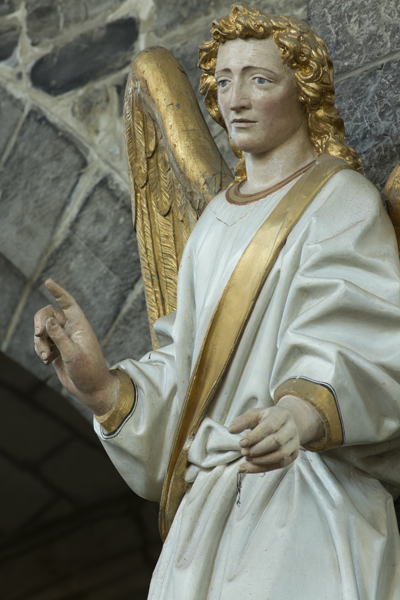
Tournai
