= Tournai =

City in Hainaut Province, Wallonia, Belgium

Tournai: Tornai (Picard); Doornik (Dutch)
- City and municipality
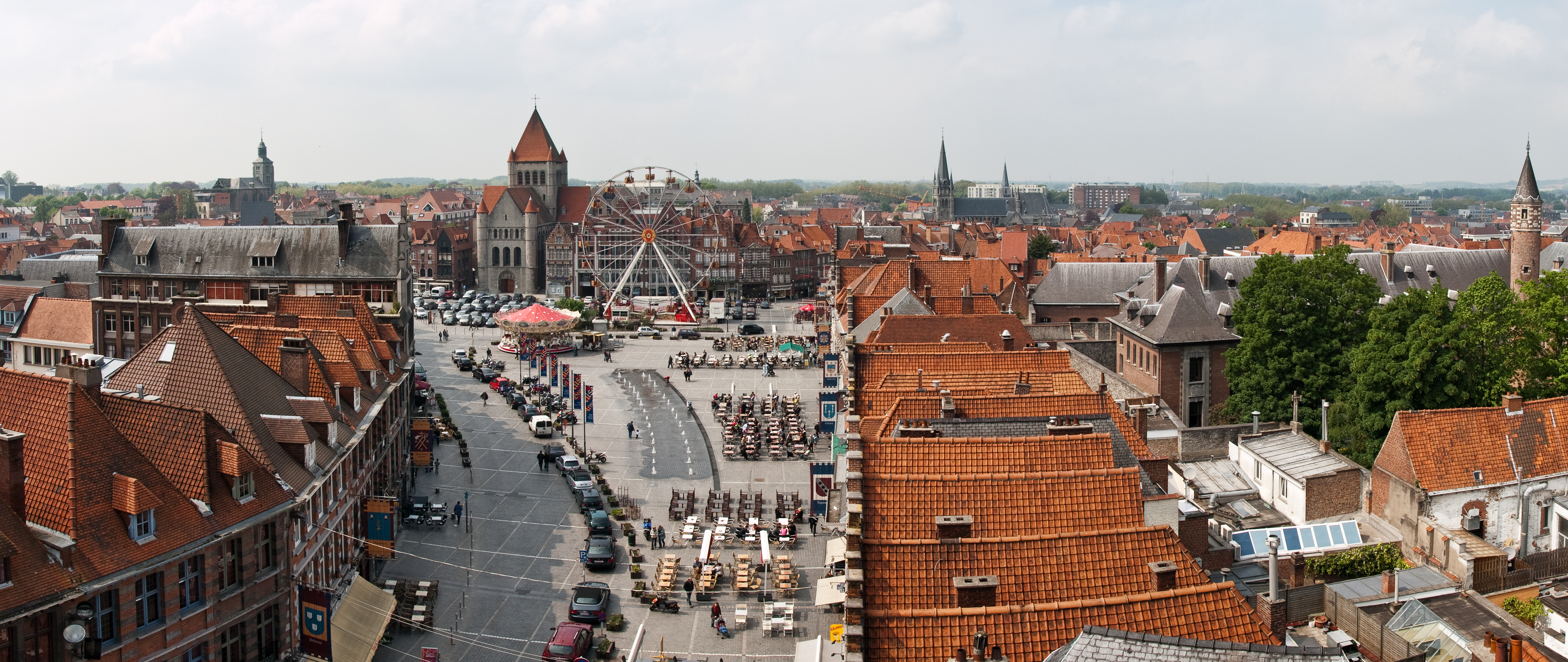
- Grand-Place of Tournai

- Flag Coat of arms

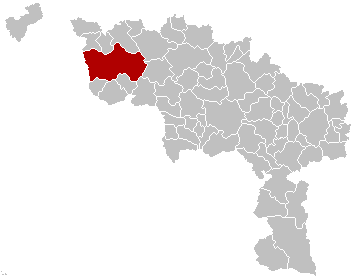
- Location of Tournai in Hainaut
- Interactive map of Tournai
- Location in Belgium
- Coordinates: 50°36′20″N 03°23′17″E
- Country: Belgium
- Community: French Community
- Region: Wallonia
- Province: Hainaut
- Arrondissement: Tournai

Government
  - Mayor: Marie-Christine Marghem (MR)
  - Governing party: PS-cdH

Area
  - Total: 215.34 km^{2} (83.14 sq mi)

Population (2018-01-01)
  - Total: 69,554
  - Density: 323.00/km^{2} (836.56/sq mi)
- Postal codes: 7500-7548
- NIS code: 57081
- Area codes: 069
- Website: tournai.be

Tournai (/tʊərˈneɪ/ toor-NAY, French: [tuʁnɛ]; Picard: Tornai; Walloon: Tornè [tɔʀnɛ]; Dutch: Doornik [ˈdoːrnɪk], sometimes anglicised in older sources as "Tournay") is a city and municipality of Wallonia located in the Province of Hainaut, Belgium. It lies 89 km (55 mi) by road southwest of the centre of Brussels on the river Scheldt, and is part of Eurometropolis Lille–Kortrijk–Tournai. In 2022, the municipality of Tournai had an estimated population of 68,518 people.

Tournai is one of the oldest cities in Belgium and has played an important role in the country's cultural history. It was the first capital of the Frankish Empire, and Clovis I was born here.

== Geography ==
Tournai lies 89 km (55 mi) by road southwest of the centre of Brussels on the river Scheldt. Administratively, the town and municipality is part of the Province of Hainaut, in the Wallonia region of southwest Belgium. The municipality has an area of 213.75 km^{2} (82.53 sq mi).

Tournai has its own arrondissements, both administrative and judicial. The municipality consists of the following:

- Barry
- Beclers
- Blandain
- Chercq
- Ere
- Esplechin
- Froidmont
- Froyennes
- Gaurain-Ramecroix
- Havinnes
- Hertain
- Kain
- Lamain
- Marquain
- Maulde
- Melles
- Mont-Saint-Aubert
- Mourcourt
- Orcq
- Quartes
- Ramegnies-Chin
- Rumillies
- Saint-Maur
- Templeuve
- Thimougies
- Tournai
- Vaulx
- Vezon
- Warchin
- Willemeau

== History ==
Tournai, known as Tornacum, was a place of minor importance in Roman times, a stopping place where the Roman road from Cologne on the Rhine to Boulogne on the coast crossed the river Scheldt. It was fortified under Emperor Maximian in the 3rd century AD, when the Roman limes was withdrawn to the string of outposts along the road. It came into the possession of the Salian Franks in 432. Under King Childeric I, whose tomb was discovered there in 1653, Tournai was the capital of the Frankish Empire. In 486, Clovis moved the center of power to Paris. In turn, a native son of Tournai, Eleutherius, became bishop of the newly created bishopric of Tournai, extending over most of the area west of the Scheldt. In 862, Charles the Bald, first king of Western Francia and still to become Holy Roman Emperor, would make Tournai the seat of the County of Flanders.

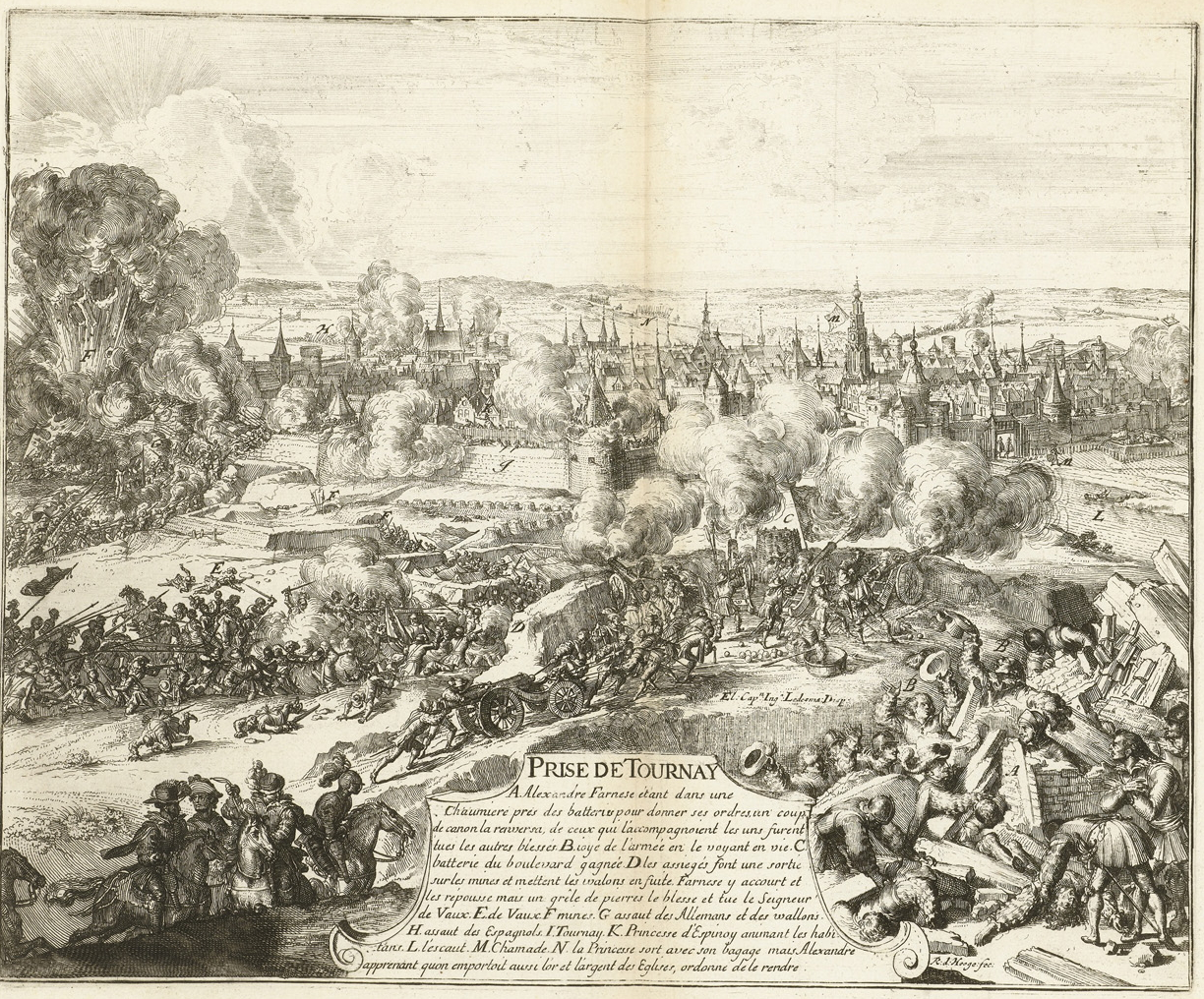
Siege of Tournai, 1581

After the partition of the Frankish Empire by the Treaties of Verdun (843) and of Meerssen (870), Tournai remained in the western part of the empire, which in 987 became France. The city participated in 11th-century rise of towns in the Low Countries, with a woollen cloth industry based on English wool, which soon made it attractive to wealthy merchants. An ambitious rebuilding of the cathedral was initiated in 1030. Odo of Orléans was appointed at the cathedral school of Tournai in 1087. Under Odo's leadership, Saint-Martin Abbey flourished and by 1105 had 70 monks. The commune's drive for independence from the local counts succeeded in 1187, and the city was henceforth directly subordinated to the French Crown, as the seigneurie de Tournaisis, as the city's environs are called. The stone Bridge of the Holes over the Scheldt, with defensive towers at either end, was built in 1290, replacing an earlier wooden structure.

In 1340, as a part of the Hundred Years' War, Edward III of England gathered a large army and besieged Tournai for a month. The operation was unsuccessful, bankrupting Edward and forcing him to sign the Truce of Espléchin.

During the 15th century, the city's textile trade boomed and it became an important supplier of tapestry. The art of painting flourished too: Jacques Daret, Robert Campin and Rogier van der Weyden all came from Tournai. It was captured in 1513 by Henry VIII of England, making it the only Belgian city ever to have been ruled by England. It was also represented in the 1515 Parliament of England. The city was handed back to French rule in 1519, following the Treaty of London (1518).

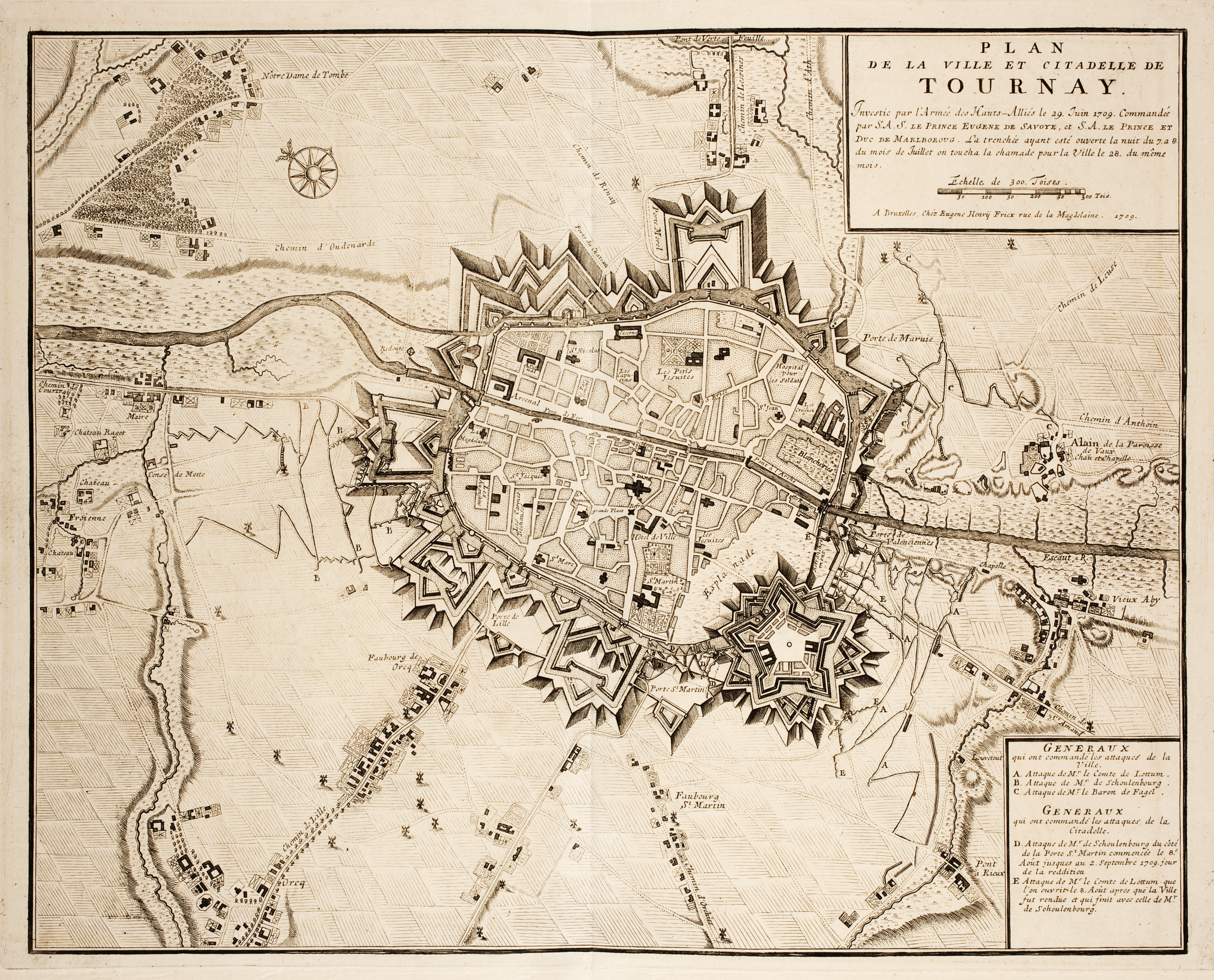
Siege of Tournai, 1709

In 1521, Holy Roman Emperor Charles V added the city to his possessions in the Low Countries, leading to a period of religious strife and economic decline. During the 16th century, Tournai was a bulwark of Calvinism, but eventually it was conquered by the Spanish governor of the Low Countries, the Duke of Parma, following a prolonged siege in 1581. After the fall of the city, its Protestant inhabitants were given one year to sell their possessions and emigrate, a policy that was at the time considered relatively humane, since very often religious opponents were simply massacred.

One century later, in 1668, the city briefly returned to France under King Louis XIV in the Treaty of Aix-la-Chapelle following the siege of Tournai. The city was besieged by the Duke of Marlborough during the War of Spanish Succession in 1709. At the end of the war in 1713, under terms of the Treaty of Utrecht the former Spanish Netherlands, including Tournai, came into possession of the Austrian Habsburgs. The city was again successfully besieged by France in 1745. In 1794, France annexed the Austrian Netherlands during the French Revolutionary Wars and Tournai became part of the department of Jemmape. From 1815 on, following the Napoleonic Wars, Tournai formed part of the United Netherlands and after 1830 of newly independent Belgium. Badly damaged in 1940 during World War II, Tournai has since been carefully restored.

== Main sights ==
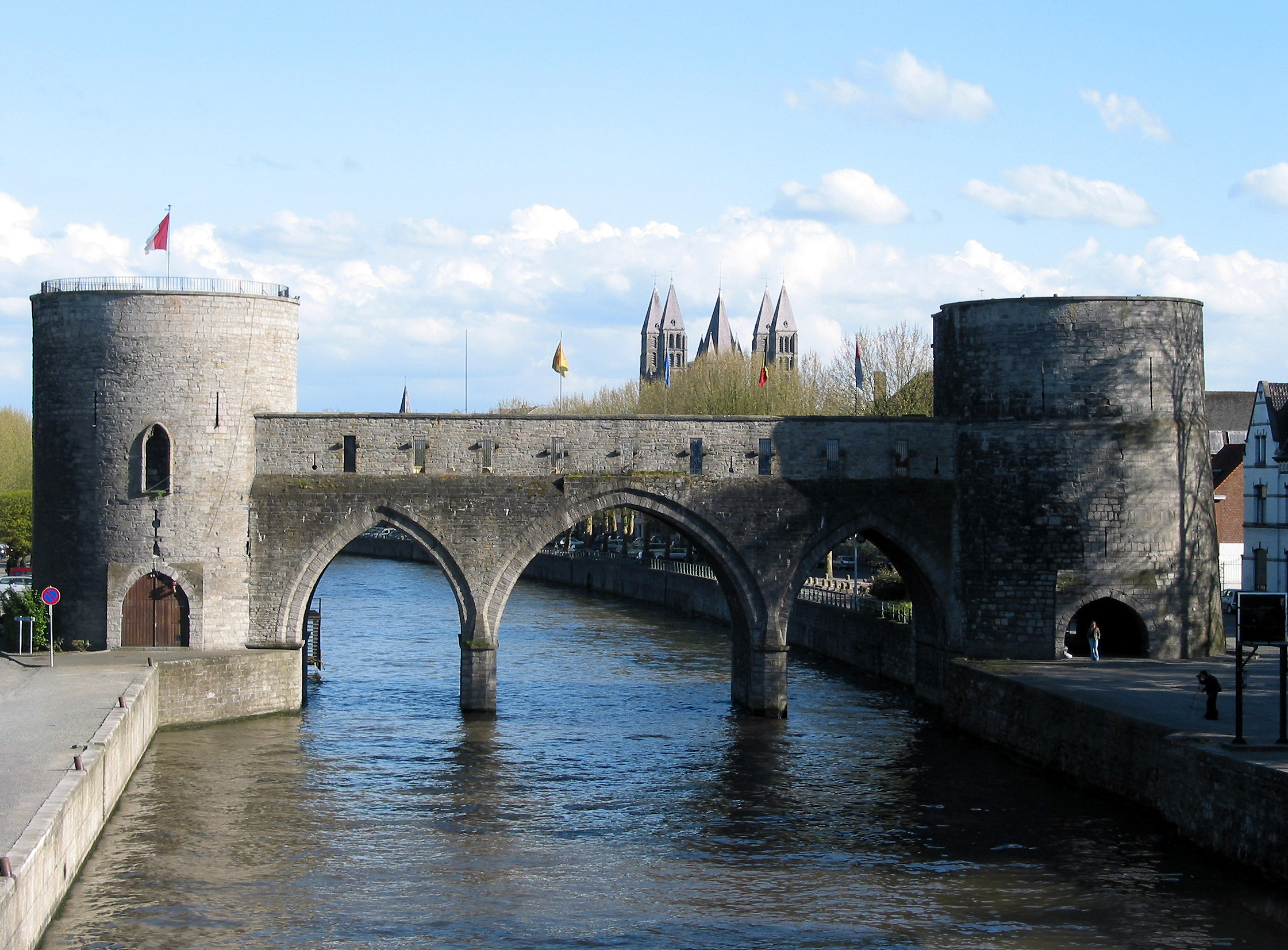
Bridge of the Holes on the river Scheldt with Our Lady's Cathedral of Tournai in the distance

Tournai is considered to be one of the most important cultural sites in Belgium. The mixed Romanesque- and Gothic-style Cathedral of Our Lady and the city's Belfry, considered the oldest in Belgium, have been designated by UNESCO as World Heritage Sites. Inside the cathedral, the Châsse de Notre-Dame flamande, a beautifully ornate 12th-century reliquary, gives witness to Tournai's wealth in the Middle Ages.

Other places of interest are the 13th-century Scheldt bridge (Pont des Trous) and the main square (Grand-Place), as well as several old city gates, historic warehouses, and a variety of museums. As in many Belgian cities, there are a number of cafés and pubs on the Grand-Place. In the middle of the square, there are a series of water fountains, while a circular staircase to the top of the Belfry can be climbed.

On the Rue Barre-St-Brice are two of the oldest private houses in Europe, dating from between 1175 and 1200 and built in the Romanesque style, while the Rue des Jésuites includes a Gothic house from the 13th century. There are also several buildings in the Art Nouveau style across the city.

== Culture ==
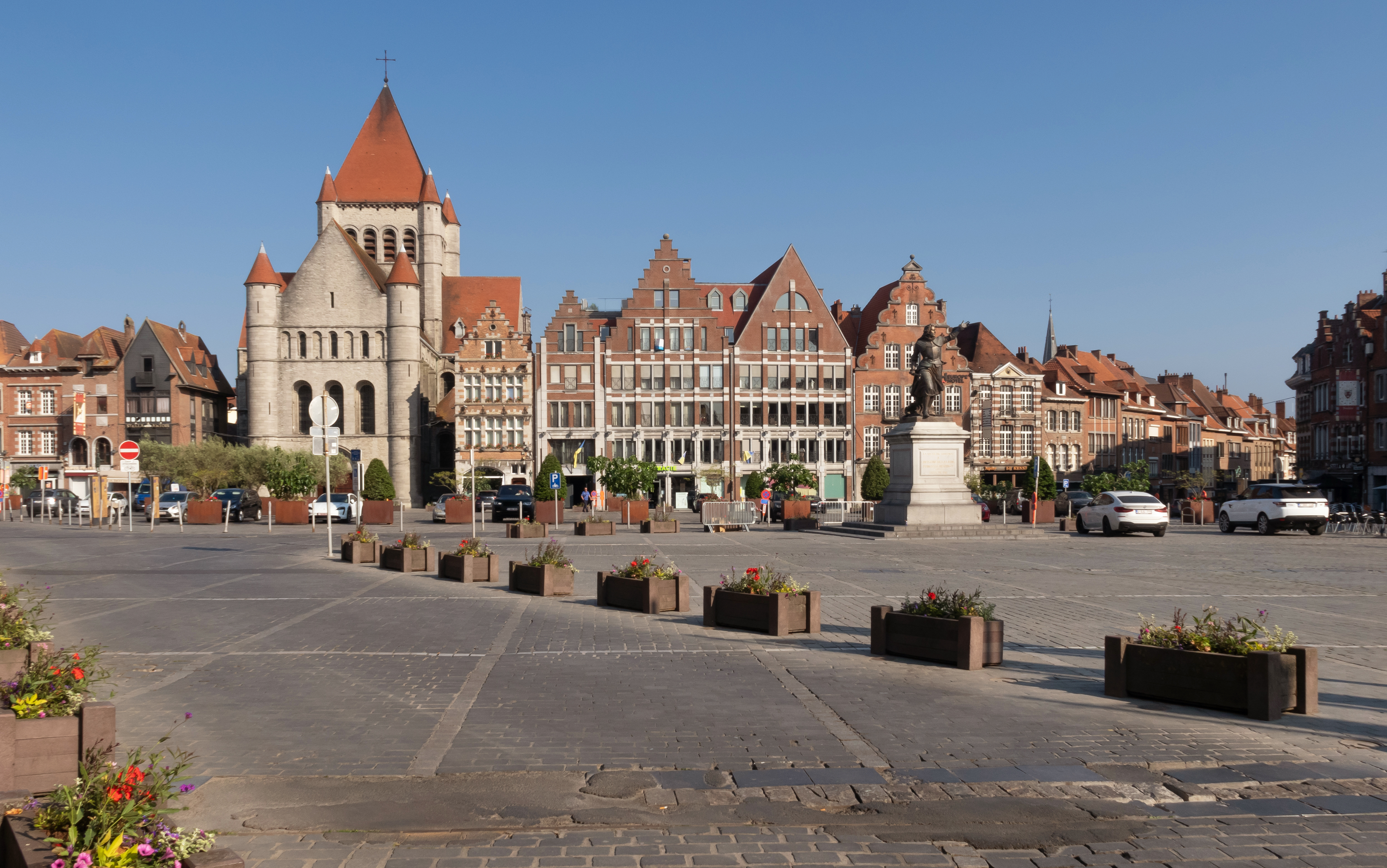
Grand-Place of Tournai

The dominant language in Tournai is French. The local language was historically tournaisien, a Picard dialect similar to that of other municipalities of Hainaut and Northern France. Tournai also belongs to Romance Flanders, like Lille, Douai, Tourcoing, and Mouscron. The city was one of the greatest cultural and economic centres of the County of Flanders. Some traces can still be seen today:

- The Gothic choir of Our Lady's Cathedral is a precursory element of the Scaldian (meaning from the Scheldt area), typically Flemish, Gothic art.
- The Bishopric of Tournai was the religious capital of Flanders during more than a millennium (from 496 to 1559).
- The tapestries and draperies of Tournai belong to the great Flemish school of tapestry and Tournai was part of the Flemish Hansa of London, which also included the draper towns of Flanders.
- The Church of St. Brice, dedicated to Saint Britius, is one of the first examples of the hallekerk style, so typical of the Flemish countryside.
- The Church of St. Quentin, a Catholic parish church in Romanesque style with Gothic elements, known to have existed since the 10th century. The current building was built around 1200, but has been altered several times throughout history. It contains important sculptures by the 15th-century sculptor Jean Delemer.
- Some of the great Flemish Primitives are from Tournai: Robert Campin, Rogier van der Weyden, and Jacques Daret.

Although Tournai is in the Flemish cultural area (of the Scheldt), it also possesses some treasures of the Mosan style. Indeed, the two most beautiful shrines of the cathedral, commissioned by the Bishop of Tournai, were made in the region of Liège by the artist Nicholas of Verdun: the shrines of Saint-Eleutherius and of Our Lady of Flanders (13th century). Those shrines testify to the opulence of Tournai and Liège during the Middle Ages. The shrine of Our Lady of Flanders has been called one of the seven wonders of Belgium.

=== Festivities ===
- The "Great Procession" (in French: Grande Procession) is a procession initiated by the bishop Radbot II during a plague epidemic. It has taken place every year since 1092, with the single exception of the year 1566, when the iconoclasts considerably damaged the religious symbols of the city. This historic procession unfolds in the streets every second Sunday of September.
- The first Monday after January 6 is known as "Lost Monday" (in French: Lundi perdu) or "Perjury Monday" (Lundi parjuré). This tradition dates from more than 700 years ago. The wealthier city inhabitants used to prepare fastidious family dinners and elect a king. Today, the family dinners have expanded to wider groups and a rabbit dish is often served.

== Demographics ==
Group of origin	Year		Year		Year		Year	
Group of origin	2000		2010		2020		2026	
Group of origin	Number	%	Number	%	Number	%	Number	%
Belgians with Belgian background	56,057	83,2	52,847	76,5	48,389	70	45,591	66
Belgians with foreign background	7,331	10,9	9,926	14,4	12,149	17,6	13,991	20,3
Neighbouring country	5,052	7,50	6,321	9,15	7,171	10,38	7,668	11,10
EU27 (excluding neighbouring country)	792	1,17	1,166	1,68	1,457	2,11	1,623	2,35
Outside EU 27	1,487	2,20	2,439	3,53	3,521	5,09	4,700	6,80
Non-Belgians	3,991	5,9	6,270	9,1	8,545	12,4	9,484	13,7
Neighbouring country	3,225	4,78	4,943	7,16	6,053	8,76	6,117	8,85
EU27 (excluding neighbouring country)	344	0,51	571	0,82	737	1,07	773	1,12
Outside EU 27	422	0,62	756	1,09	1,755	2,54	2,594	3,75
Total Population	67,379	100	69,043	100	69,083	100	69,066	100

== Education ==
The Faculty of Architecture, Architectural Engineering and Urban Planning of the French-speaking University of Louvain (UCLouvain) is located in Tournai.

== People born in Tournai ==
- Clovis I, first king of all Salian Franks (5th century)
- Gilles Li Muisis, French chronicler and poet (13th century)
- Rogier van der Weyden, Flemish painter (15th century)
- Jacques Daret, Flemish painter (15th century)
- Pierre de La Rue, Franco-Flemish composer (15th century)
- Perkin Warbeck, impostor and pretender to the throne of England (15th century)
- Marbrianus de Orto, Franco-Flemish composer (15th-16th century)
- Charles Blount, 5th Baron Mountjoy, courtier and patron of learning (16th century)
- Isaac Le Maire, pioneering merchant of the VOC, the Dutch East India Company (16th century)
- Louise Françoise, Princess of Condé (1673-1743) illegitimate daughter of Louis XIV and his most famous mistress Madame de Montespan.
- Donat Casterman, publisher (18th century)
- Philippe de la Motte, 1556–1617, Pastor at Tournai (1582/3) and of Walloon Church, Southampton (1586).
- Piat Sauvage, painter (19th century)
- Louis Gallait, painter (19th century)
- Jean-Baptiste Moëns, philatelist (19th century)
- Jules Bara, statesman (19th century)
- Georges Rodenbach, Symbolist poet and novelist (19th century)
- Hélène Dutrieu, cycle racer, stunt driver and aviator (19th and 20th centuries)
- Marc Quaghebeur, writer (20th century)
- Xaveer De Geyter, architect (20th century)
- Gabrielle Petit, spy for the British Secret Service during the First World War, executed in 1916 by the Germans (20th century)
- Gisèle Wibaut, resistance fighter and politician (20th century)
- Viviane Nicaise, cartoonist and colorist (21st century)

== Image gallery ==
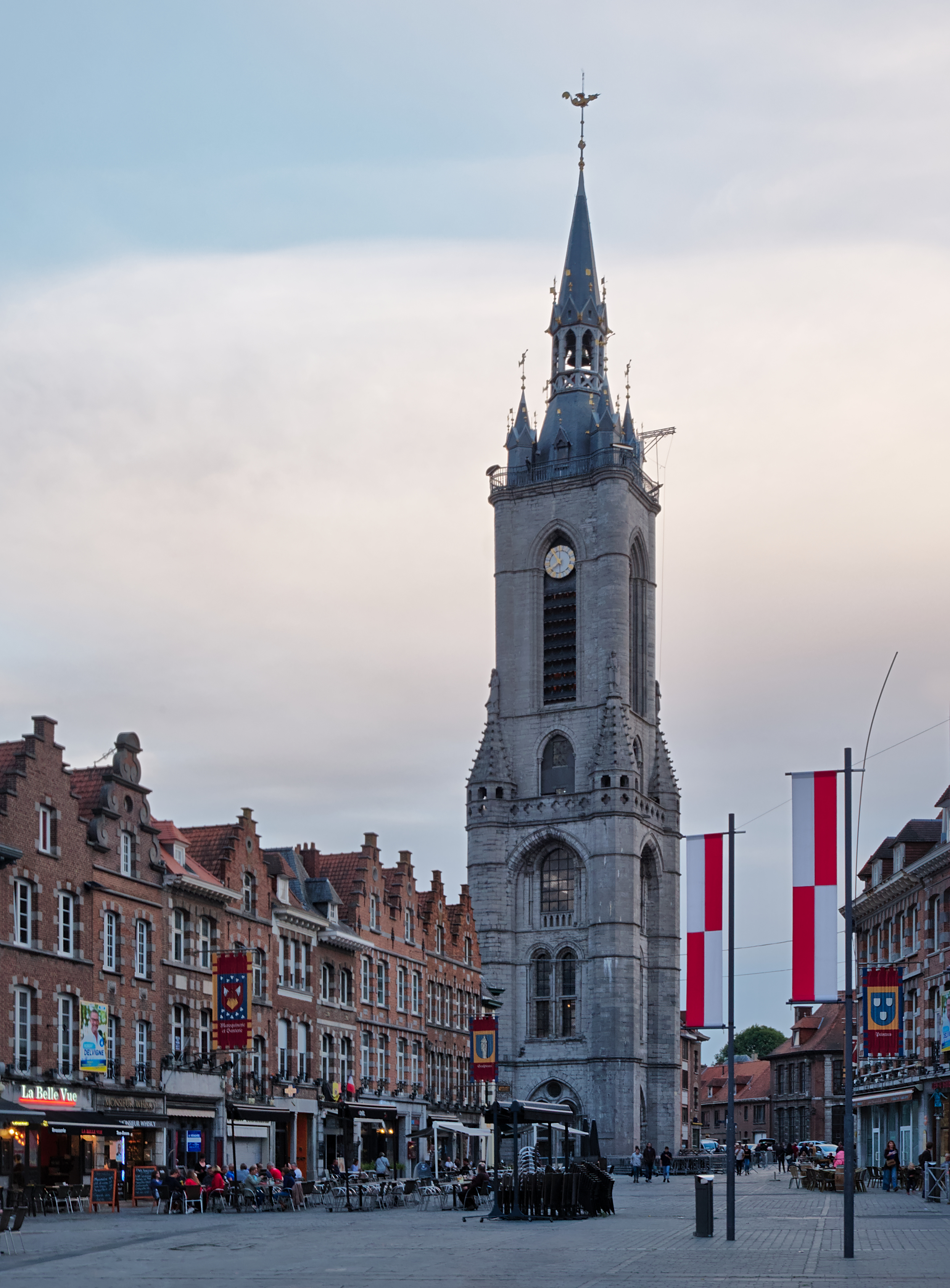
Belfry of Tournai

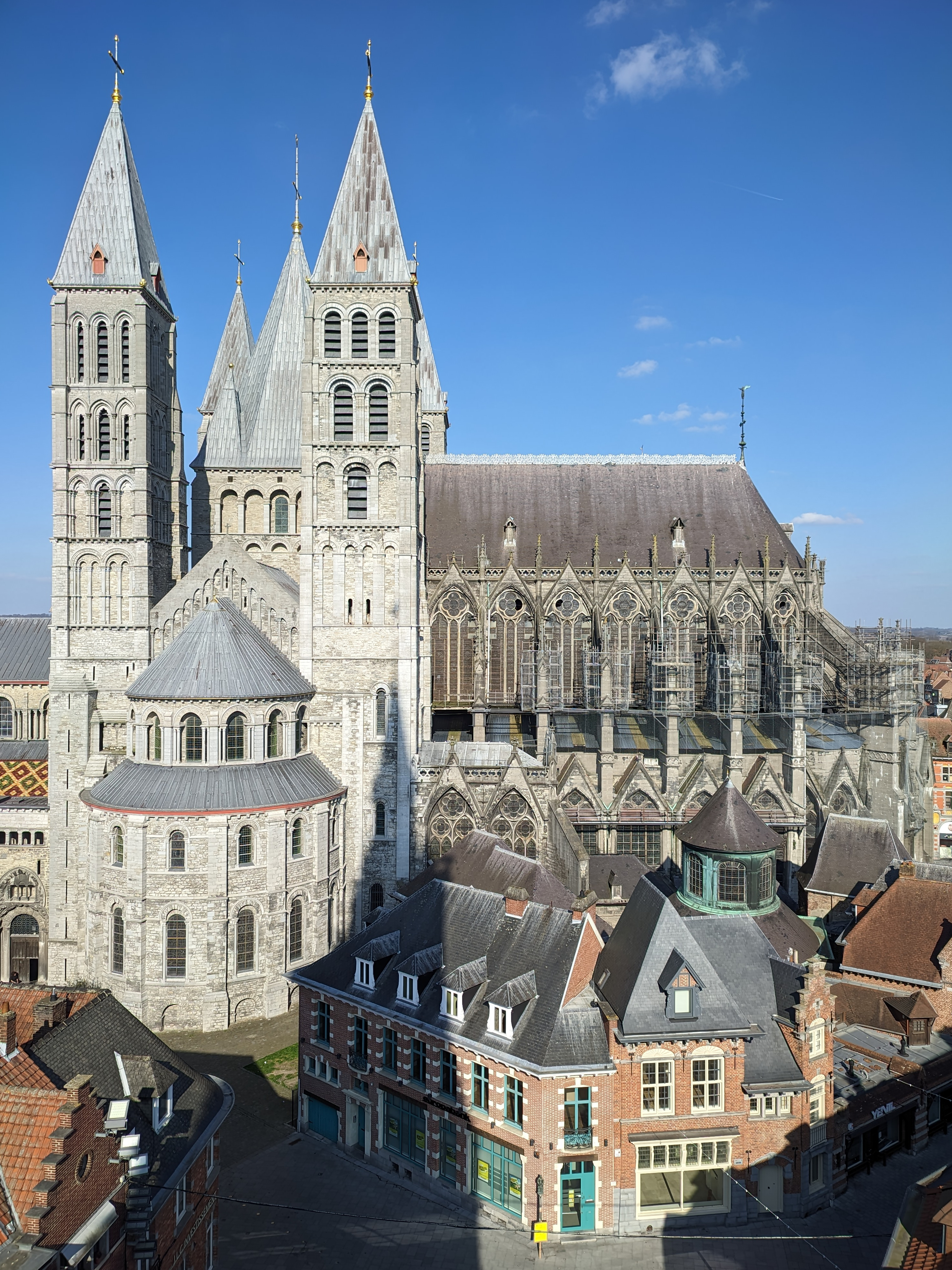
Cathedral of Our Lady of Tournai

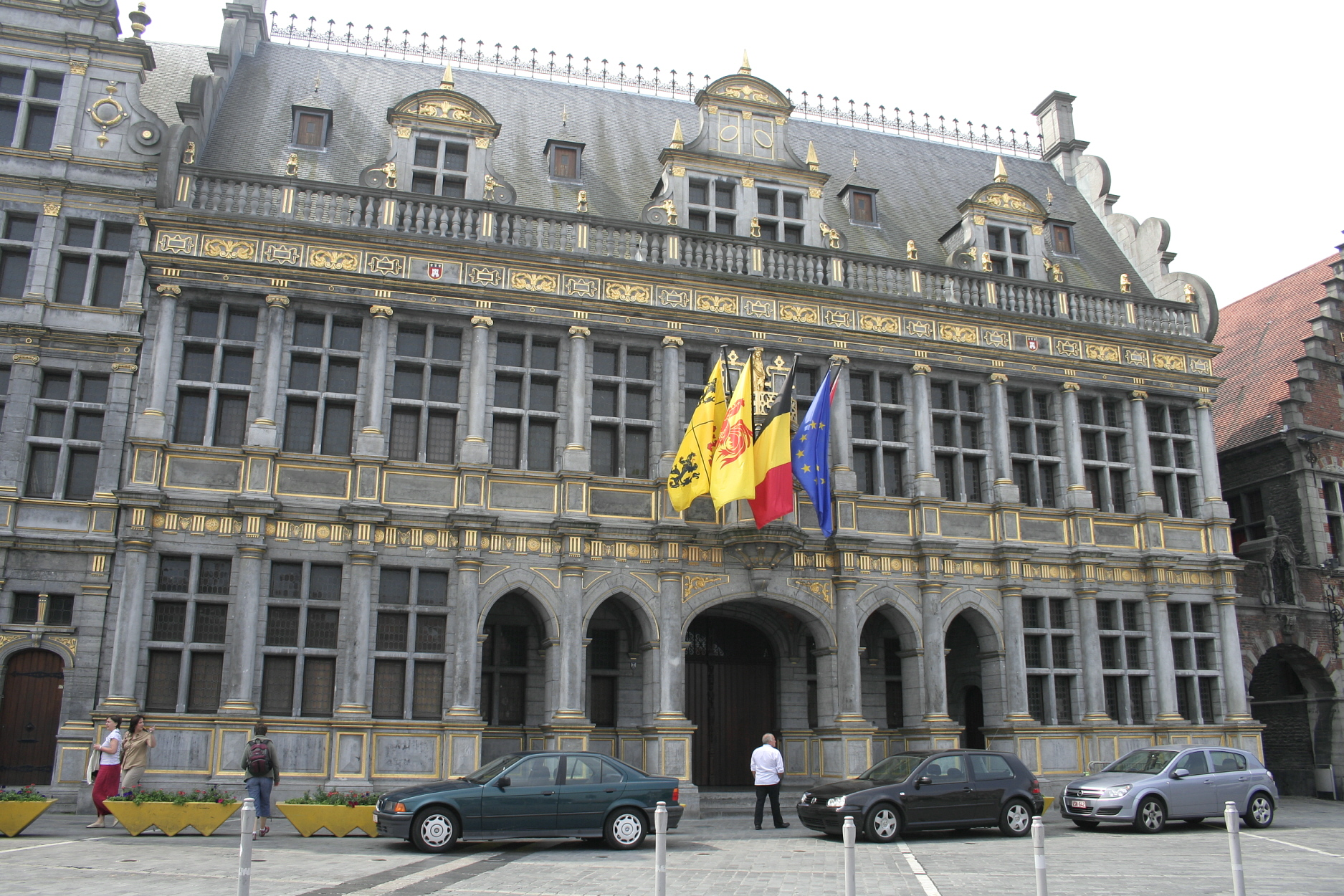
Cloth Hall

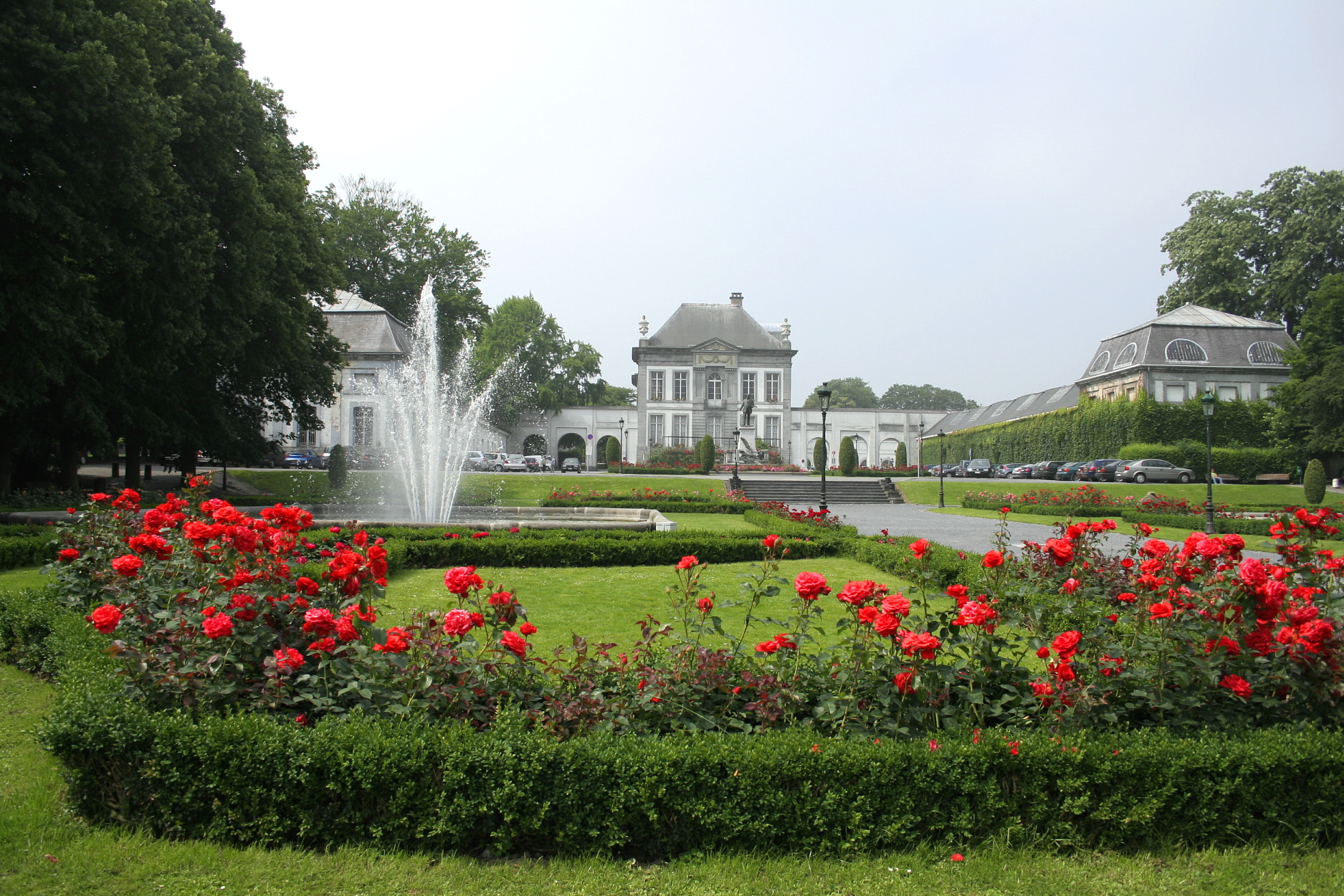
Town Hall and park

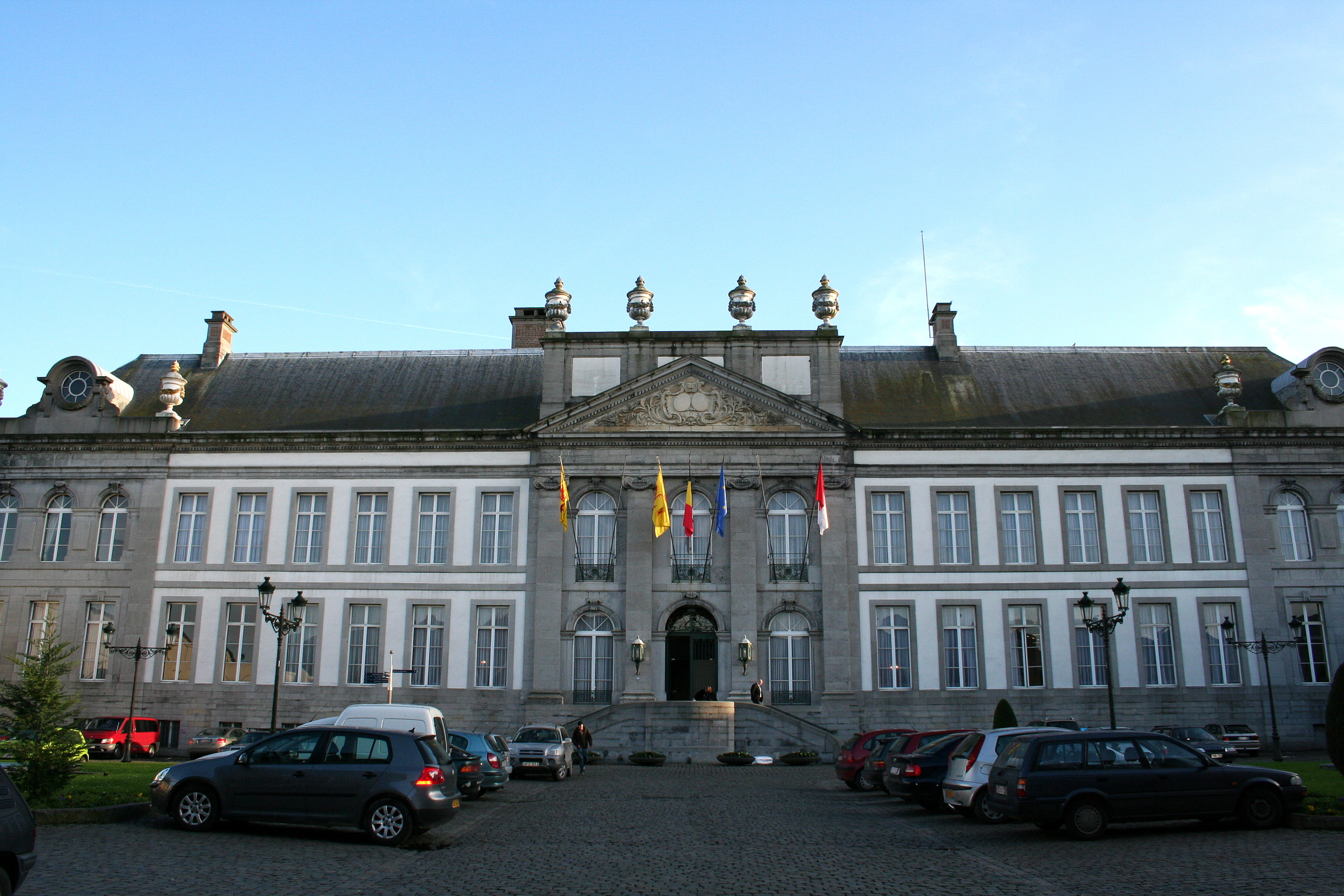
Town Hall

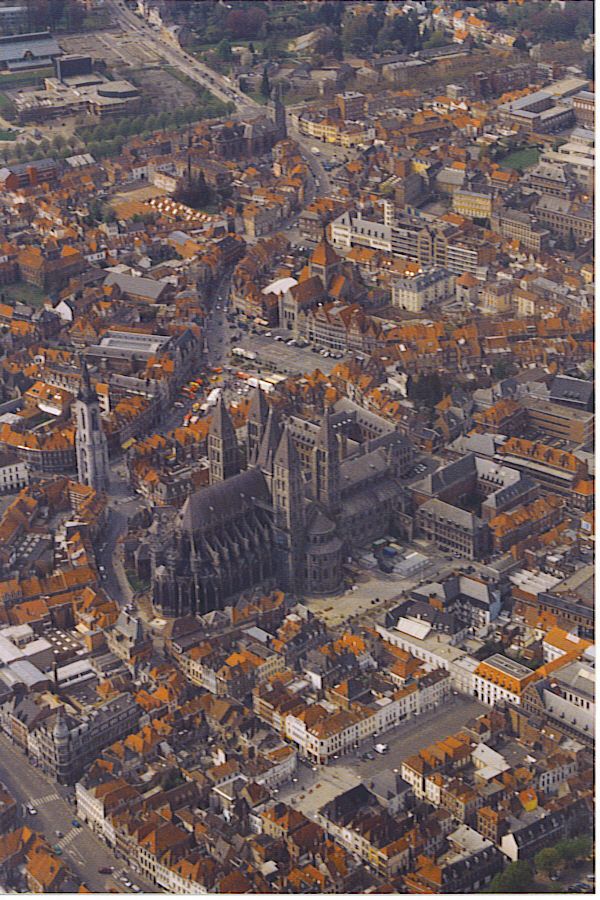
Aerial view of Tournai

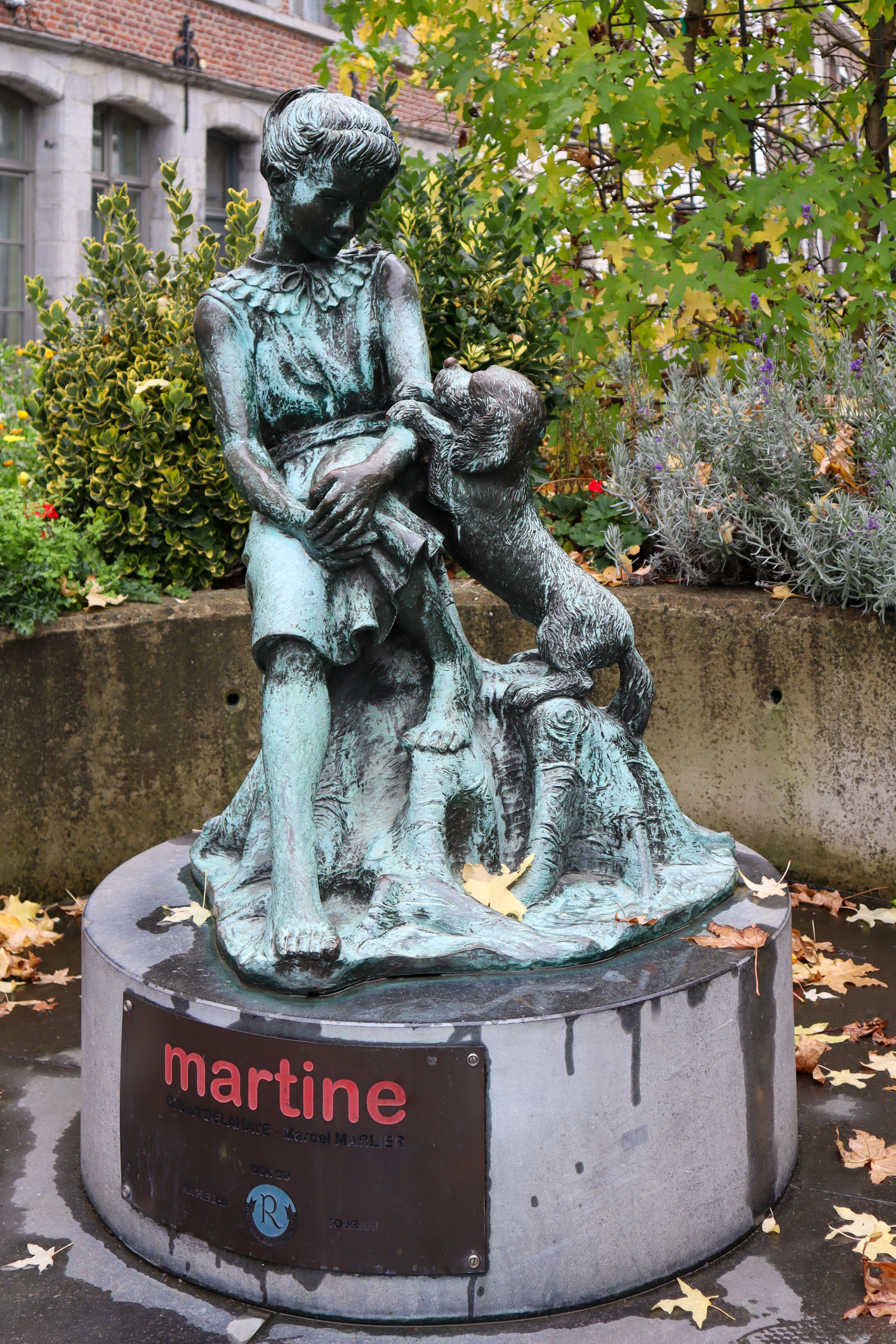
Statue of Martine

== Twin towns ==
- Troyes, France
- Villeneuve-d'Ascq, France
- Bethlehem, Palestine
- Tarija, Bolivia
