= Portrait of a Young Woman (van der Weyden) =

Drawing by Rogier van der Weyden

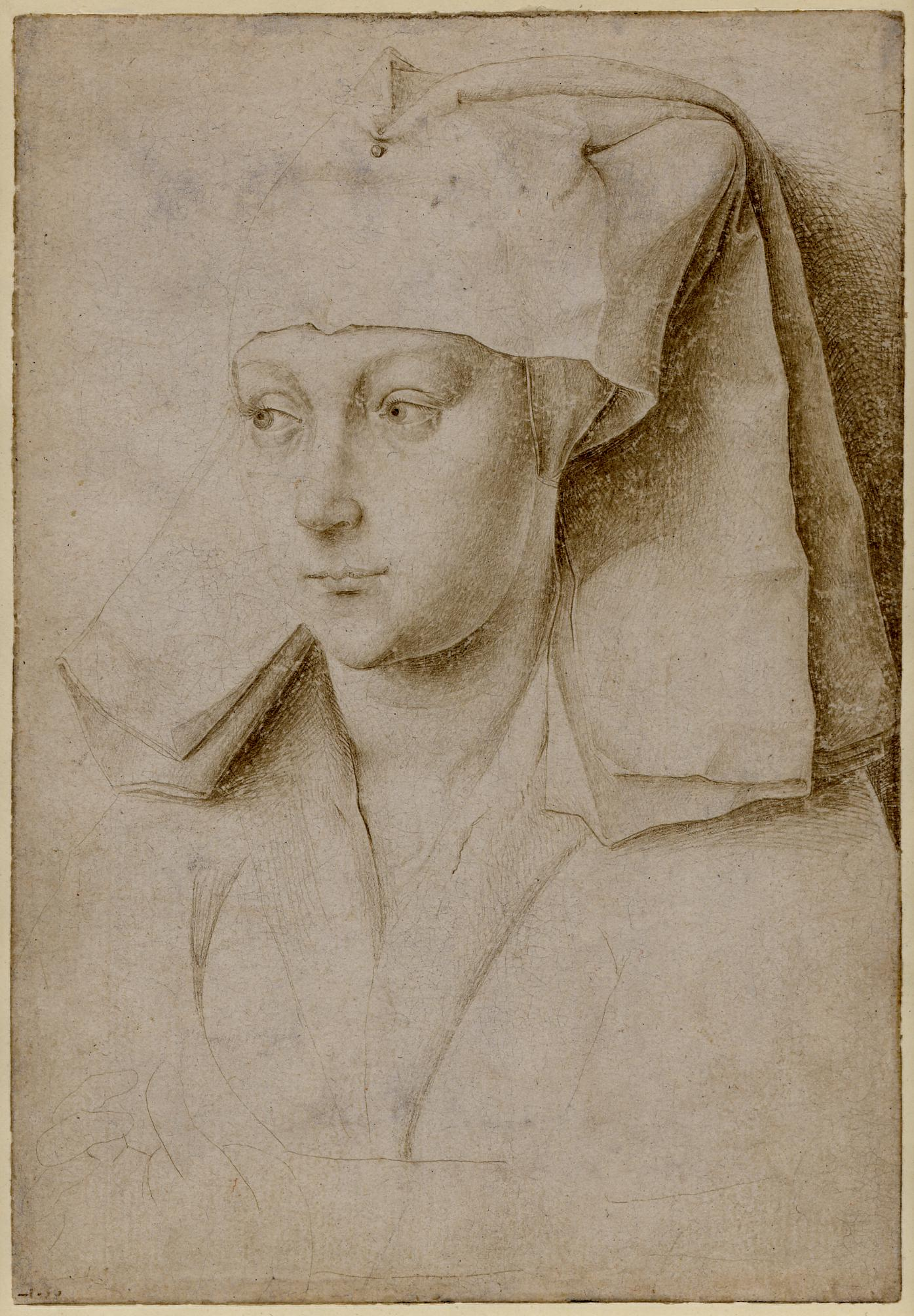
- Artist: Rogier van der Weyden
- Year: Circa 1440–1445
- Type: Drawing, silverpoint on ivory-coloured prepared paper
- Dimensions: 16.7 cm × 11.7 cm (6.6 in × 4.6 in)
- Location: British Museum
- Accession: PD 1874-8-8-2266
- Website: Museum page

Portrait of a Young Woman is a drawing by the Early Netherlandish artist Rogier van der Weyden. It depicts a young woman wearing a headscarf pinned to her hair and has been variously dated as c. 1430s and c. 1440 - 1445. The identity of the woman has not been established, nor her social class. The drawing is presumably a study for a painted portrait now lost, but likely to have been similar to the Portrait of a Woman in Berlin.

== Description ==
The drawing is worked in silverpoint on ivory-coloured prepared paper. On the reverse is a 17th-century (or possibly earlier) inscription "Ruggero di Bruselle/1460" (i.e. "Roger of Brussels 1460"), which suggests it was already connected with van der Weyden from an early date. The workmanship is of top quality, and the modelling is subtly worked to suggest a three-dimensional sculpture.

The sitter is presented in three-quarter view and appears lively and direct. Her clothing gives no real clue about her status. Campbell and van der Stock remark that on the one hand the relatively flat cap suggests a middle-class background, while on the other hand the fur-lined collar suggests the upper-class.

== See also ==
- List of works by Rogier van der Weyden

== Bibliography ==
- Campbell, Lorne. Van der Weyden. London: Chaucer Press, 2004. ISBN 1-904449-24-7
- Campbell, Lorne & Van der Stock, Jan. Rogier van der Weyden: 1400–1464. Master of Passions. Davidsfonds, Leuven, 2009. ISBN 978-90-8526-105-6
