= List of works by Rogier van der Weyden =

Most of the works of Rogier van der Weyden consist of triptychs, diptychs or polyptychs, each including more than one panel. Some are dismembered and the parts are kept in different museums. Some panels are only fragmentary remains.

== Works ==
This list features the paintings accepted as authentic by Dirk de Vos (2000). They are listed chronologically following the datings of de Vos. All works are executed in oil on oak panels unless otherwise mentioned.

Image	Title	Date	Location	Size	Note
	Virgin and Child Enthroned	c. 1425–1430, circa 1433	Madrid, Museo Thyssen-Bornemisza, inv. 435 (1930.125)	ca. 14 × 10 cm	Possibly dyptich
	Saint George and the Dragon	c. 1425–1430	National Gallery of Art, Washington, inv. 1966.1.1	ca. 14 × 10 cm	Possibly dyptich
	Crucifixion	c. 1425–1430	Berlin, Gemäldegalerie, Berlin, inv. nr. 538 A.	79 × 49 cm	
	Diptych with the Virgin and Child Standing in a Niche, and Saint Catherine in a landscape	c. 1430–1432	Vienna, Kunsthistorisches Museum, inv. nr. 951 and 955	both ca. 19 × 12 cm	
	Descent from the Cross	c. 1430–1435	Madrid, Museo del Prado, inv. nr. 2825.	220 × 259 cm.	
	Virgin and Child in a Niche, the so-called Durán Madonna	c. 1430–1435	Madrid, Museo del Prado, inv. nr. 272, 2	00 × 52 cm.	
	Portrait of a Woman	c. 1430–1435	Gemäldegalerie, Berlin, inv. nr. 545 D.	47 × 32 cm	Sometimes considered as the portrait of van der Weyden's wife Elisabeth Goffaert
	Annunciation Triptych	c. 1430–1435	Center panel, with the Annunciation in Paris, Musée du Louvre, inv. nr. 1982	87 × 91 cm	Triptych
	Annunciation Triptych	c. 1430–1435	wings with the Visitation and a Clergyman Kneeled in Prayer in Turin, Galleria Sabauda, inv. nr. 210 and 320	both 89 × 36,5 cm	Triptych
	Saint Luke Drawing the Virgin	c. 1435–1440	Boston Museum of Fine Arts, Higginson bequest, 93.153.	138 × 111 cm.	
	Visitation	c. 1435–1440	Leipzig, Museum der bildenden Künste, inv. nr. 1550	58 × 36 cm	
	Triptych with the crucifixion, so called: Abegg Triptych	c. 1435–1440	Riggisberg, Abegg-Stiftung, inv. nr. 14.2.63.	Center panel: 103 × 72 cm. Wings, both: 103 × 33 cm	
	Triptych of the Seven Sacraments, so called Chevrot Altarpiece	.c. 1440–1445	Antwerp, Koninklijk Museum voor Schone Kunsten Antwerpen, inv. nr. 393-395	center panel: 200 × 97 cm, Both side panels: 119 × 63 cm	
	Triptych of Our Fair Lady, so called Miraflores Altarpiece	.c. 1440–1445	Gemäldegalerie, Berlin, inv. nr. 534A.	Three panels: 74 × 45 cm each.	
	Crucifixion Triptych	.c. 1440–1445	Vienna, Kunsthistorisches Museum, inv. nr. 901.	Center panel: 96 × 69 cm. Wings: 101 × 35 cm.	
	Virgin and Child with Saints:	.c. 1440–1445			
	The Magdalen Reading	.c. 1440–1445	National Gallery, London inv. nr. 645	62 × 54 cm	
	Saint Catherine	.c. 1440–1445	Lisbon, Calouste Gulbenkian Foundation, inv. nr. 75B and 79 A	Both fragments ca. 21 × 18 cm.	
	Saint Joseph	.c. 1440–1445	Lisbon, Calouste Gulbenkian Foundation, inv. nr. 75B and 79 A	Both fragments ca. 21 × 18 cm.	
	Triptych with the Birth of Christ, so called Bladelin Triptych	c. 1445–1450	Gemäldegalerie, Berlin, inv. nr. 535	Center panel: 94 × 92 cm, Wings each: 94 × 42 cm.	+ two outside faces of the side panels: the Annunciation
	Jean Wauquelin presenting his 'Chroniques de Hainaut' to Philip the Good, dedication miniature from the 'Chroniques de Hainaut'	c. 1445–1450	Brussels, Royal Library of Belgium, ms. 9242, fol.1	paint on parchment, 15,4 × 20 cm (illustration), 42,3 × 28,8 (leaf).	Apparently Rogier's only surviving miniature.
	Beaune Altarpiece, so called: Last Judgement	c. 1445–1450	Beaune, Hôtel-Dieu, Beaune	The large center part measures 210 × 100 cm, the small upper wings measure 72 × 45 cm. Opened the polyptych measures 210 × 548 cm.	Originally oil on oak panels, today some panels are transferred to canvas. The polyptych consists of 15 different parts
	Saint Margareth and Saint Apollonia	c. 1445–1455	Gemäldegalerie, Berlin, inv. nr. 534C.	51,5 × 27,5 cm.	Right wing of a lost triptych. Other sourses: "...with workshop"
	The Braque Triptych	c. 1450–1455	Paris, Musée du Louvre, inv. nr. RF 2063	Center panel: 34 × 62 cm, wings each 34 × 27 cm.	
	Portrait of a man	c. 1450–1455	Madrid, Museo Thyssen-Bornemisza, inv. nr. 1930.26.	32 × 23 cm.	
	Triptych with the Adoration of the Magi, so-called Columba Altarpiece	c. 1450–1455	Munich, Alte Pinakothek, inv. nr. WAF 1189-1191	Center panel: ca. 140 × 153, Wings each: ca. 140 × 73 cm.	
	Triptych with scenes from the life of John the Baptist, so called Saint Johns Altarpiece	c. 1450–1455	Gemäldegalerie, Berlin, inv. nr. 534B	Each panel ca. 77 × 48 cm.	
	The crucified Christ between the mourning Mary and Saint John, so called Crucifixion of Scheut	c. 1450–1455	El Escorial, inv. nr. 10014602.	325 × 192 cm.	
	Pietà	c. 1455–1464	Brussels, Royal Museums of Fine Arts of Belgium, inv. nr. 3515.	33 × 47 cm.	
	Diptych of Jean Gros:	c. 1455–1460		Both wings ca. 39 × 29 cm.	Dyptich
	Left wing: Virgin with Child	c. 1455–1460	Musée des Beaux-Arts Tournai, inv. nr. 481	Both wings ca. 39 × 29 cm.	
	Right wing: Portrait of Jean Gros	c. 1455–1460	Art Institute of Chicago, Ryerson Collection nr. 1933.1052.	Both wings ca. 39 × 29 cm.	
	Portrait of Francesco d'Este	c. 1455–1464	New York, Metropolitan Museum of Art, Friedsam Collection, inv. nr. 32.100.43.	ca. 30 × 20 cm.	
	Diptych of Philip de Croÿ with The Virgin and Child			both wings ca. 49 × 30 cm.	Dyptich
	Left wing: Virgin and Child		San Marino (California), The Huntington Library, inv. nr. 26.105	both wings ca. 49 × 30 cm.	Dyptich
	Right wing: Portrait of Philippe de Croy		Antwerp, Koninklijk Museum voor Schone Kunsten Antwerpen, inv. nr. 254	both wings ca. 49 × 30 cm.	Dyptich
	Portrait of a Woman	c. 1460	National Gallery of Art, Washington, D.C., inv. 1937.1.44	34 cm x 25.5 cm	
	Portrait of Charles the Bold	c. 1461–1462	Gemäldegalerie, Berlin, inv.nr. 545.	51 × 34 cm.	Now believed to be by workshop and circle (Gemäldegalerie Berlin)
	Portrait of Antoine, 'Grand Bâtard' of Burgundy	c. 1461–1462	, Brussels, Royal Museums of Fine Arts of Belgium, inv.nr. 1449.	38 × 28 cm	
	Virgin and Child	c. 1461–1462	Houston, Museum of Fine Arts, Edith A. and Percy S. Strauss Collection, inv. nr. 44-535.	32 × 23 cm.	
	Virgin and Child with four Saints, the so-called Medici Madonna	c. 1460–1464	Städel, Frankfurt, inv. nr. 850.	51 × 38 cm.	
	Diptych of Jean de Froimont	c. 1463–1464		both wings ca. 51 × 33 cm	(According to a publication by Dominique Vanwijnsberghe)
	Left wing: Virgin and Child	c. 1463–1464	Caen, Musée des Beaux-Arts, inv.nr. M.91	both wings ca. 51 × 33 cm	(According to a publication by Dominique Vanwijnsberghe)
	Right wing: Portrait of Jean de Froimont	c. 1463–1464	Brussels, Royal Museums of Fine Arts of Belgium, inv.nr. 4279	both wings ca. 51 × 33 cm	(According to a publication by Dominique Vanwijnsberghe)
	Entombment of Christ, or Lamentation of Christ	c. 1463–1464	Florence, Uffizi Gallery, inv.nr. 1114	96 x 110 cm	
	Calvary diptych, left wing: Mary in grief, supported by Saint John, right wing: Crucifixion	c. 1463–1464	Philadelphia, Philadelphia Museum of Art, The John G. Johnson Collection, inv.nr. 334-335	Left panel: 180.3 × 93.8 cm (71.0 × 36.9 in); right panel: 180.3 × 92.6 cm (71.0 × 36.5 in)	Probably the outside of the wings of a lost carved altarpiece

== Works not listed by De Vos ==
- A Man Reading (Saint Ivo?), National Gallery, London. The National Gallery attributes it to the workshop of Rogier van der Weyden
- Portrait of Isabella of Portugal (van der Weyden), Getty Center. The portrait was probably completed by a member of Rogier van der Weyden's workshop, although it was earlier attributed to him.
- Portrait of Philip the Good (van der Weyden) from Dijon
- Saint Hubert Altarpiece in the Chapel of St Hubert in the church of St Gudule, Brussels
- Saint Jerome and the Lion (van der Weyden) in Detroit

Copies after Van der Weyden

- A 15th-century copy after the Madrid Descent from the Cross by an anonymous master (the so-called Edelheer-triptych) is preserved in the Sint-Pieterskerk, Leuven, Belgium.

== Other ==
- Tapestry: The Justice of Trajan and Herkinbald
- Drawing: Portrait of a Young Woman (van der Weyden), British museum

== Sources ==
- de Vos, Dirk (2000). Rogier van der Weyden: The Complete Works. Harry N Abrams. ISBN 0-8109-6390-6
