= Portrait of Francesco d'Este =

Painting by Rogier van der Weyden

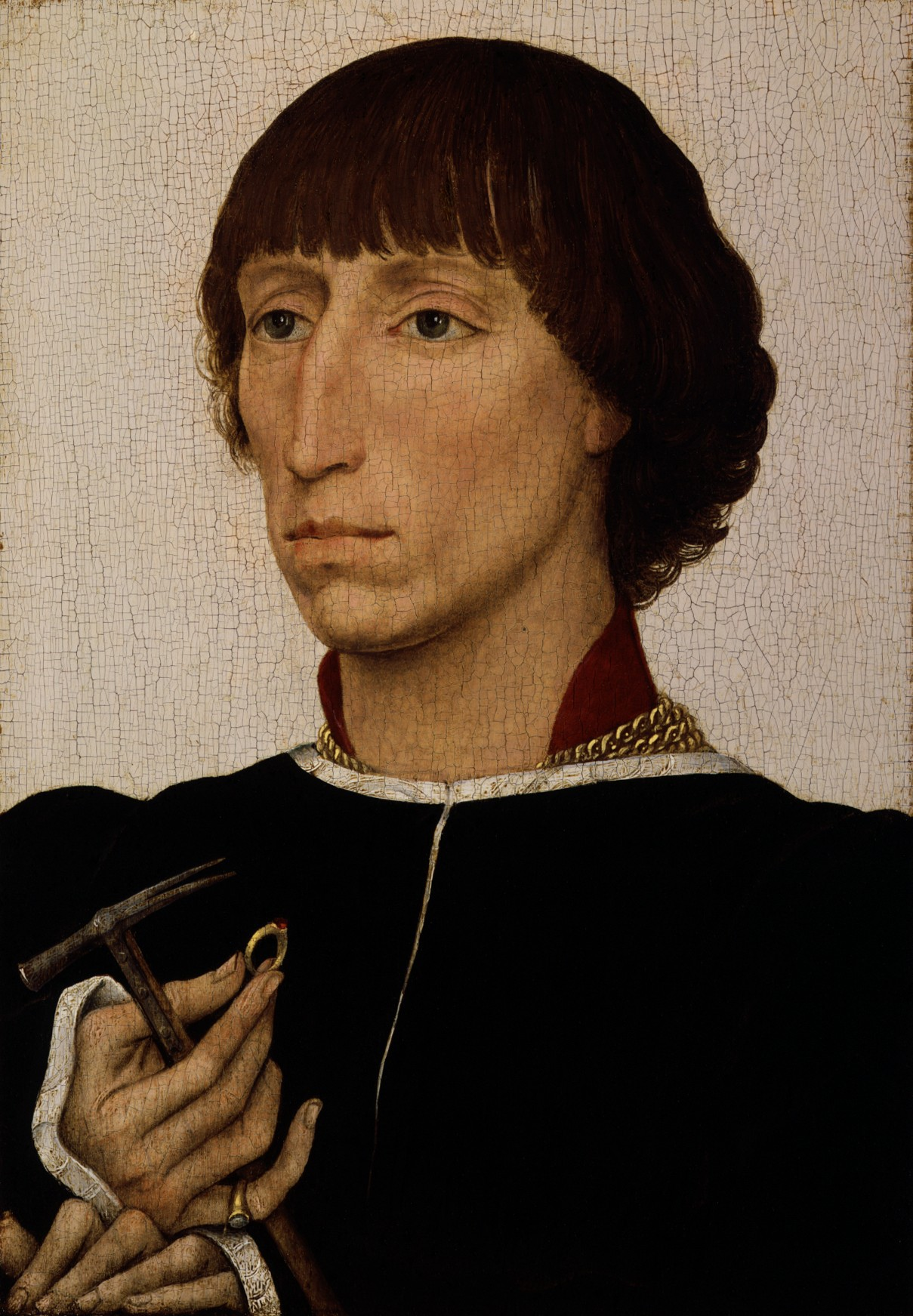
Portrait of Francesco d'Este, Rogier van der Weyden, oil on wood panel, 29.8 cm × 20.3 cm. Metropolitan Museum of Art, New York

Portrait of Francesco d'Este is a small oil on wood panel painting by the Netherlandish painter Rogier van der Weyden dating to around 1460. The work is in good condition and has been in the Metropolitan Museum of Art, New York, since 1931. When attributed as a van der Weyden in the early 20th century, there was much speculation amongst art historians as to the sitter's identity. He was identified as a member of the d'Este family from the crest on the reverse and long thought to be Francesco's father Lionello, an Italian and highly placed Burgundian prince and patron of Rogier. In 1939 Ernst Kantorowicz identified the man as Lionello's illegitimate son Francesco (c. 1430 – after 1475), which is now generally accepted. The panel was painted when the sitter was about 30 years old and is considered one of van der Weyden's finest portraits, in many ways a culmination of his later, more austere work.

Van der Weyden sought to flatter d'Este; although not handsome, he is shown as broad-chested, with a sensitive and cultured face, keen expression, long neck and aquiline nose. The hammer and ring (the latter only revealed after a 1934 cleaning) clutched in his hand are likely intended as status symbols although their exact significance has not been positively identified. Typically of van der Weyden, the sitter's fingers are highly detailed and prominent, shown as almost resting on the lower left of the panel frame, and are long, bony and highly detailed. The painting is unusually secular for the time, seeking to flatter d'Este's worldly position, rather than highlight his devotional worth or personal humility.

The portrait follows the structural conventions of van der Weyden's late-career male portraits. It is a half-length, three-quarters view of the sitter against a plain and shallow background. The background is one of its most striking features, its shallowness at odds with the deep, shadowed and atmospheric kind popular in Northern art since van Eyck. That the background is layered with white, rather than the more typical dark grey and black tones, has been remarked on by many art historians.

== Identity of sitter ==
The paintings of the Early Netherlandish masters fell out of fashion after the 16th century, and many disappeared from record only to re-emerge in the 19th century. This work was lost until sometime in the late 1800s when it came into the collection of Sir Audley Neeld. There was much speculation as to the identity of the sitter; he was early identified as a member of the d'Este family from the crest shown on the back of the panel. In the early 20th-century, he was thought to be Francesco's father Leonello, based on similarities to the subject of a portrait of Pisanello. Leonello would have been around 42 at the time and died from a cranial abscess the following year.

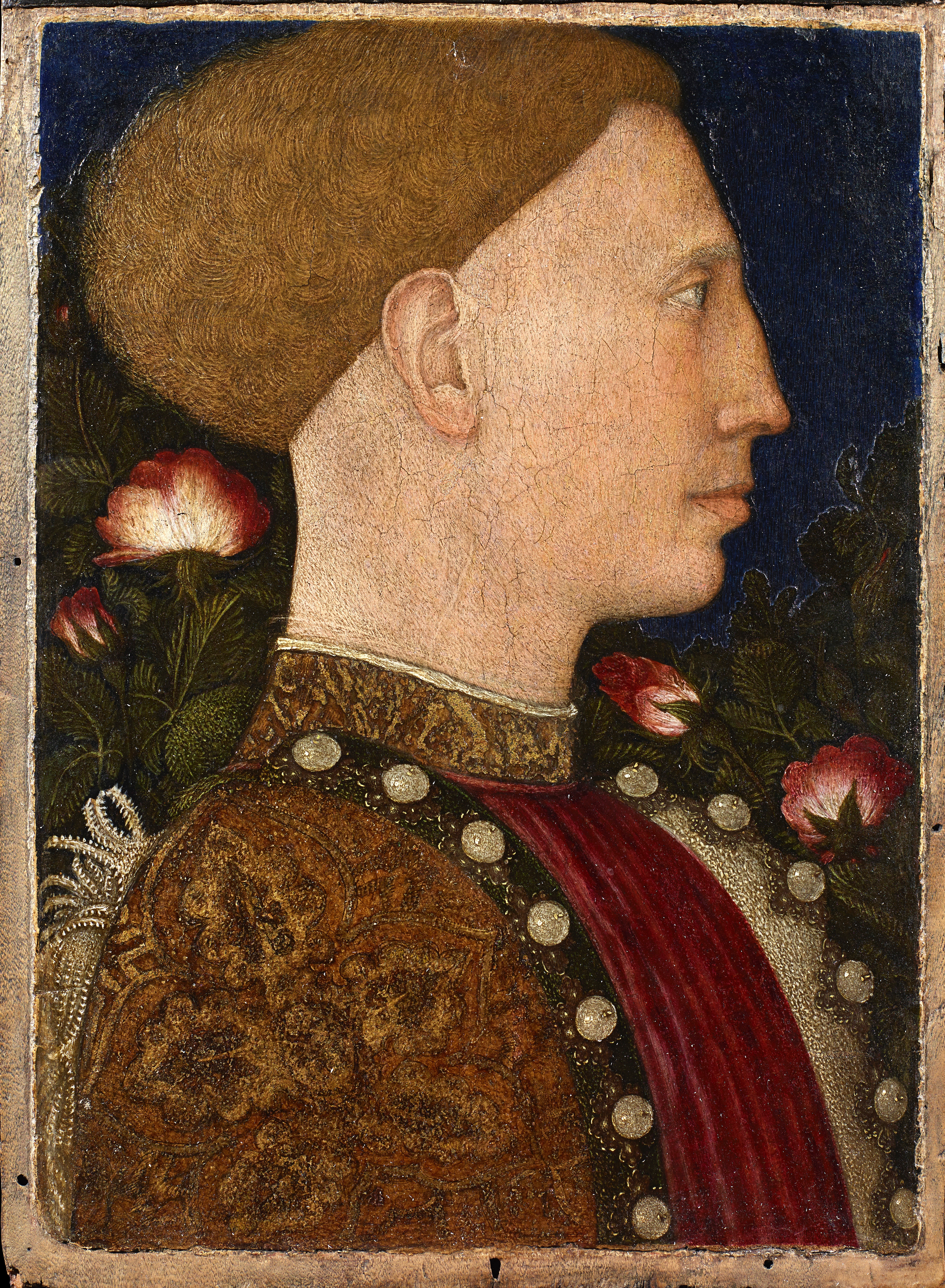
Leonello D'Este portrayed by Pisanello. van der Weyden was for a period the highest placed artist at the Ferrarese court.

At another time the panel was titled Portrait of a Goldsmith, presumably based on a misunderstanding of the significance of the hammer held in d'Este's right hand. Francesco's identity as sitter was established in 1939–40 by the art historian Ernst Kantorowicz. His representation here bears striking resemblance to a documented contemporary portrait found in a piece of iconography in Rome, as well as to an attributed portrait in the National Gallery of Art, Washington.

Francesco d'Este was the bastard son of the highly placed Lionello of Meliaduse d'Este, a marquis of Ferrara, Duke of Modena and Reggio Emilia, and the illegitimate son of Niccolò d'Este III. Francesco spent most of his life as a military officer in the Netherlands. However he returned to Italy several times, usually as a Burgundian ambassador. He was sent by his father to the Burgundian court in 1444 to be raised and educated with Charles the Bold, and later given the title "Marquis of Ferrara". It is possible Francesco was killed in 1476 at the Grandson battlefield near Courcelles, in today's Belgium. His identity is established through the coat of arms shown on the reverse of the panel and through the inscription Francisque, also on the reverse.

== Description ==
=== Portrait ===
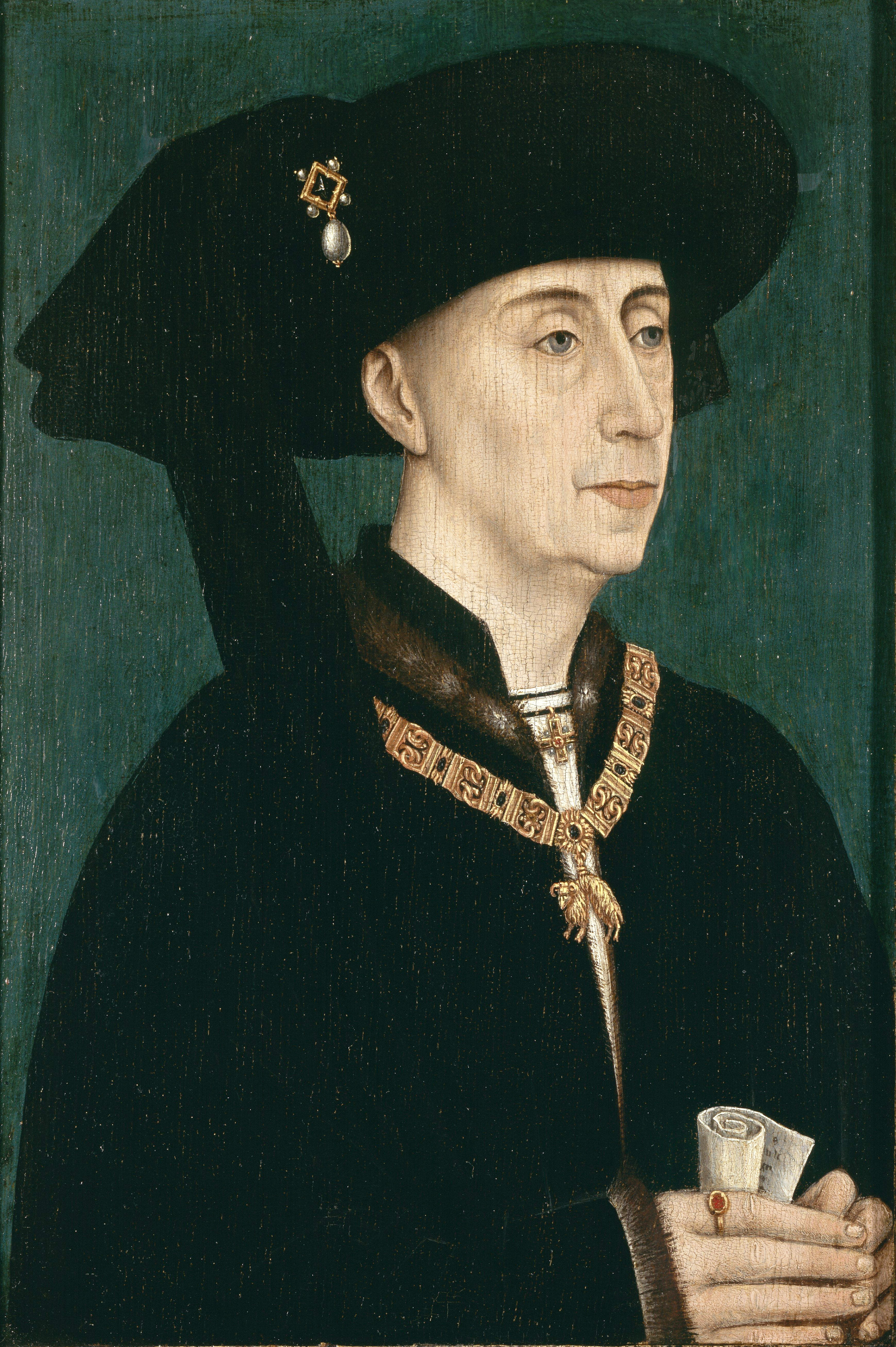
Portrait of Philipp the Good, after 1450, Royal Museums of Fine Arts of Belgium, Belgium

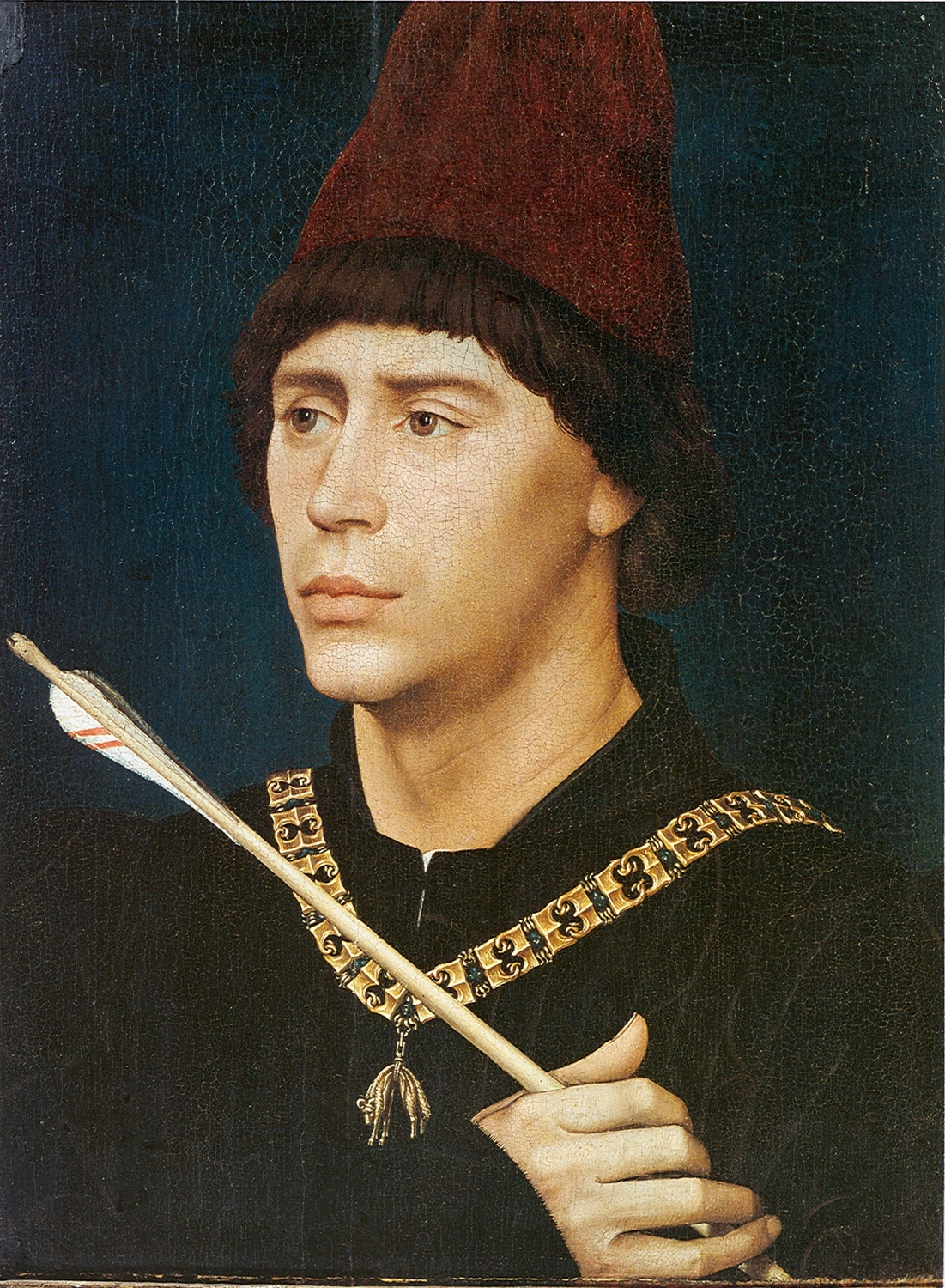
Portrait of Antoine, 'Grand Bâtard' of Burgundy, c 1460, Royal Museums of Fine Arts of Belgium

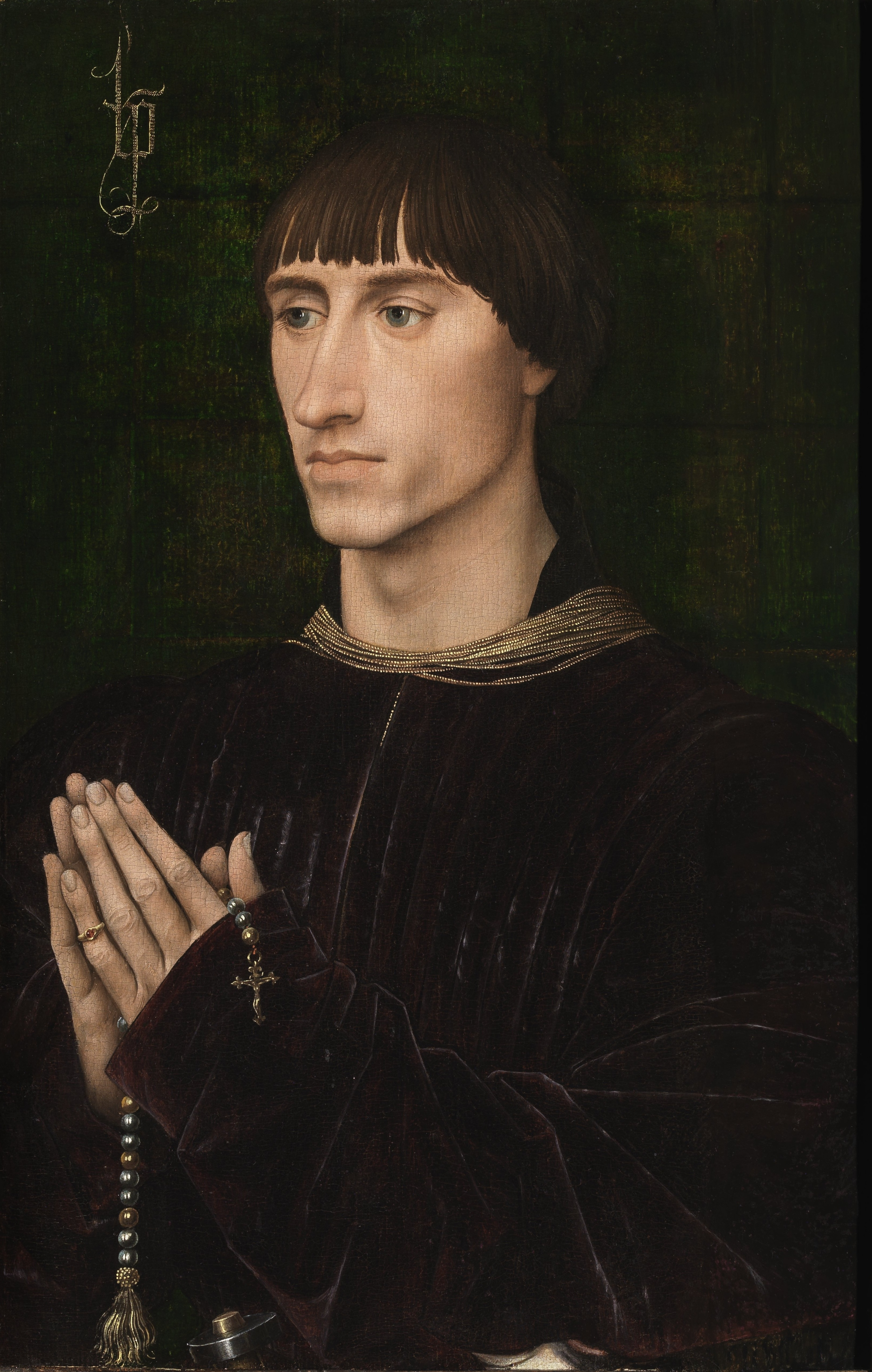
Portrait of Philippe I de Croÿ, c. 1460, Koninklijk Museum voor Schone Kunsten, Antwerp

The portrait was executed around 1460, late in van der Weyden's career, at a time when he was a highly sought-after and prestigious portraitist. The panel is noted for its abandonment of the style developed by Jan van Eyck, which had become the standard model for northern painters until then, a style perhaps typified by Petrus Christus 's 1446 Portrait of a Carthusian. In contrast to the deep atmospheric space the sitters occupy in these works, here d'Este is set against a plain white or ivory flattened background with little shadow, a hark back to the traditions of the style of the International Gothic. The portrait is an advancement from the donor portraits common at the time, in part because it celebrates the sitter's earthly, secular values, and is absent of any moralising overtones or religious iconography.

It is one of the many portraits van der Weyden was commissioned Dukes of Burgundy from the late 1450s. In common with most of van der Weyden's male portraits, d'Este is shown half profile, staring aloofly into the middle distance. The painting has been described as embodying the "essence of court society ... with its aristocratic bearing and mannered elegance."

d'Este's broad chest is out of proportion to his long, bony fingers and wide enough that his head looks undersized in comparison - it reaches across the width of the canvas. Yet he has a sensitive face and slightly aloof expression, which gives the impression of thoughtful dignity, refinement, and a hint of intellectual ennui. He has clear, youthful skin accentuated by the white background, a Roman-style bridged nose, and a projecting lower lip and rounded chin. Yet he is not a handsome man. The painter's forensic style reveals sunken eyes and heavy lids. His hair is not tightly held back as in the Pisanello portrait of his father, but falls over his ears and across his forehead in an almost monkish style.

He holds a hammer and a ring in his right hand. Their exact significance is unknown, although they are thought by art historians to be allusions to court ritual and society. The hammer is maybe a symbol of his authority as a knightly nobleman, related to his privileges and duties as a prince of his realm, perhaps connected with tournament ritual. It may also represent the hammer of the holy year, a symbol connected with the Jubilee. The ring held between his thin, bony fingers may be a jousting prize. The ring had been painted out and was only rediscovered in 1934 when the painting was cleaned.

=== Reverse ===
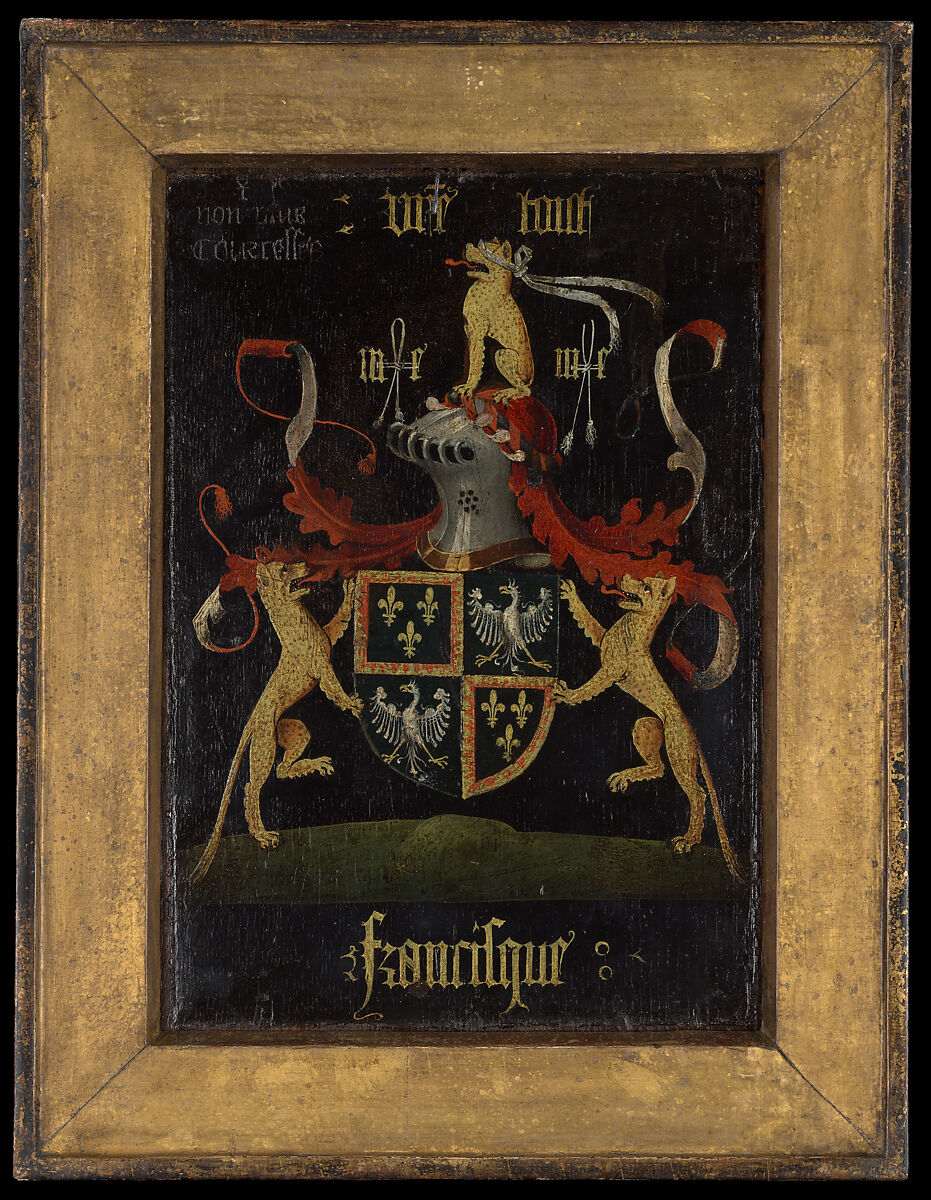
The family coat of arms shown on the reverse of the panel

The reverse of the panel shows a coat of arms consisting of the family arms quartered with representations of the honours bestowed on the d'Este family by Charles VII of France by letters patent in January 1431. The coat of arms is held by two lynxes-a pun on the word Leonello, his father's first name; another of the animal sits blindfolded on the arms. On either side of the animal are the letters M E - assumed to be abbreviations for Marchio Estenis (Marquis of Este). However, they could equally stand for "Marchio Estenses", a title known to have been used by Leonello. On both sides, these letters are bound by tasselled chord. Lettering resembling inscription in the later gothic style above these reads VOIR TOUT (to see all). It is reminiscent of Leonello's motto Quade Vides ne Vide (Shut your eyes to what you see), the latter described by art historian Robert Fry as indicative of the "idea of astuteness, the most necessary virtue for a ruler of Leonello's type.

The achievement contains Francesco's name in French, the Burgundian court language, and at the top left-hand corner the words non plus courcelles (no longer courcelles). This phrase is established as a later addition, but has not been satisfactorily interpreted. It may be a reference to Courcelles, a village in today's Belgium. The village is located near the site of the Battle of Grandson, a major defeat for Charles the Bold, where the sitter may have been killed in 1476 (he is last mentioned in records in 1475). Given the similarity of the crest to that of his father's, as well as the significance of various letterings, many art historians see it as indicative of the illegitimate sitter's aspiration to be recognised as Leonello's son, with all the entitlements and historical recognition such acceptance would entail.

== Provenance and attribution ==
The painting was in the possession of Sir Audley Neeld of Chippenham until sold to R. Langton Douglas in 1909. It passed through the collection of Edgar Speyer before it was donated to the Metropolitan Museum of Art by Michael Friedsam in 1931.

The authorship of van der Weyden has never been seriously contested since the late 19th century, although d'Este was not established as the sitter until 1939. The panel displays many of the typical characteristics of male portraits painted around the time of his visit to England, including the plain, shallow backdrop, the three-quarters view, the slightly pious middle gaze, and the focus on the sitter's thin and delicate hands. The work is exemplary of van der Weyden's handling of paint, and its choice and richness of colour are marked as one of his c 1460 male portraits completed during his visit to Italy, in the opinion of many art historians, perhaps his finest.

== See also ==
- List of works by Rogier van der Weyden

== Sources ==
- Ainsworth, Maryan Wynn. From Van Eyck to Bruegel: Early Netherlandish painting in the Metropolitan Museum of Art. New York: Metropolitan Museum of Art, 1999. ISBN 0-300-08609-1
- Bauman, Guy. "Early Flemish Portraits 1425–1525". The Metropolitan Museum of Art Bulletin, Vol. 43, no. 4, Spring, 1986
- Campbell, Lorne. Van der Weyden. London: Chaucer Press, 2004. ISBN 1-904449-24-7
- Friedländer, Max J. "The Pictures of Rogier van der Weyden in America." Art in America, no. 9, 1921. 62–63, 65
- Fry, Roger. "A Portrait of Leonello d'Este by Roger van der Weyden." Burlington Magazine 18, January 1911. 200–202
- Hand, John Oliver & Wolff, Martha. Early Netherlandish Painting. Washington: National Gallery of Art, 1986. ISBN 0-521-34016-0
- Harbison, Craig. "The Art of the Northern Renaissance". London: Laurence King Publishing, 1995. ISBN 1-78067-027-3
- Hulin de Loo, Georges. "Diptychs of Rogier van der Weyden". Burlington Magazine, Volume 43, No. 245, 1923
- Porras, Stephanie. Art of the Northern Renaissance: Courts, Commerce and Devotion. London: Laurence King Publishing, 2018. ISBN 978-1-7862-7165-5
- Scher, Stephen. Perspectives on the Renaissance medal. Routledge, 1999. ISBN 0-8153-2074-4
