= A Man Reading (Saint Ivo?) =

Painting by the workshop of Rogier van der Weyden

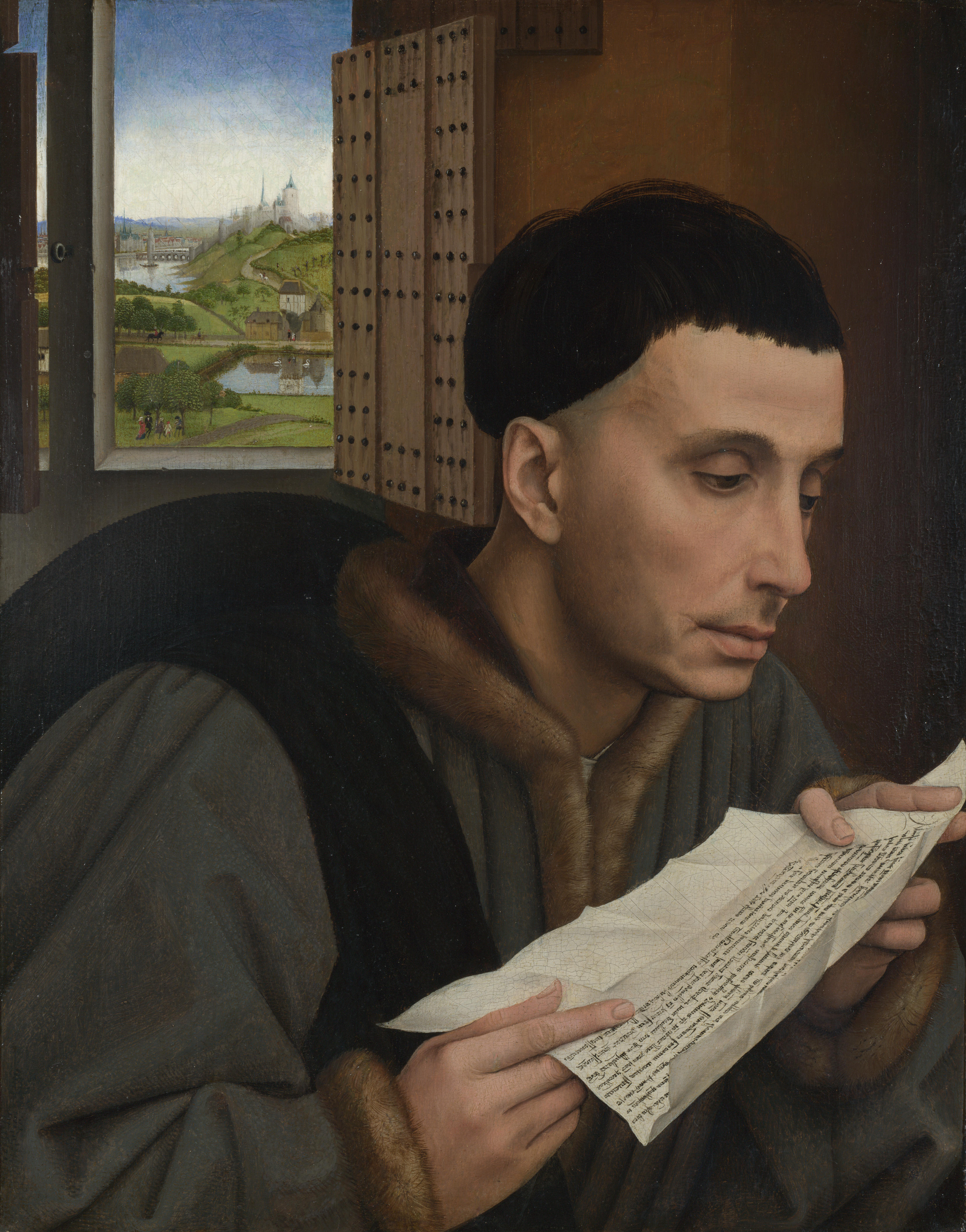
- Artist: Workshop of Rogier van der Weyden, but see text
- Year: c. 1450
- Type: Oil paint on oak
- Dimensions: 44 by 35 centimetres (17 in × 14 in)
- Location: National Gallery; London

A Man Reading (Saint Ivo?) is the name given to a panel painting in the collection of the National Gallery, London. The work has been attributed to Rogier van der Weyden, and it has been proposed that it depicts Saint Ivo of Kermartin. The National Gallery attributes it to the workshop of Rogier van der Weyden.

It has been claimed that the work is not by van der Weyden or other Early Netherlandish painters working under his name, but is instead a forgery by Eric Hebborn. According to an article published in The Independent by Geraldine Norman, in 1996 Hebborn claimed to have painted the work.

== See also ==
- List of works by Rogier van der Weyden
