= Crucifixion Diptych (van der Weyden) =

Diptych by Rogier van der Weyden

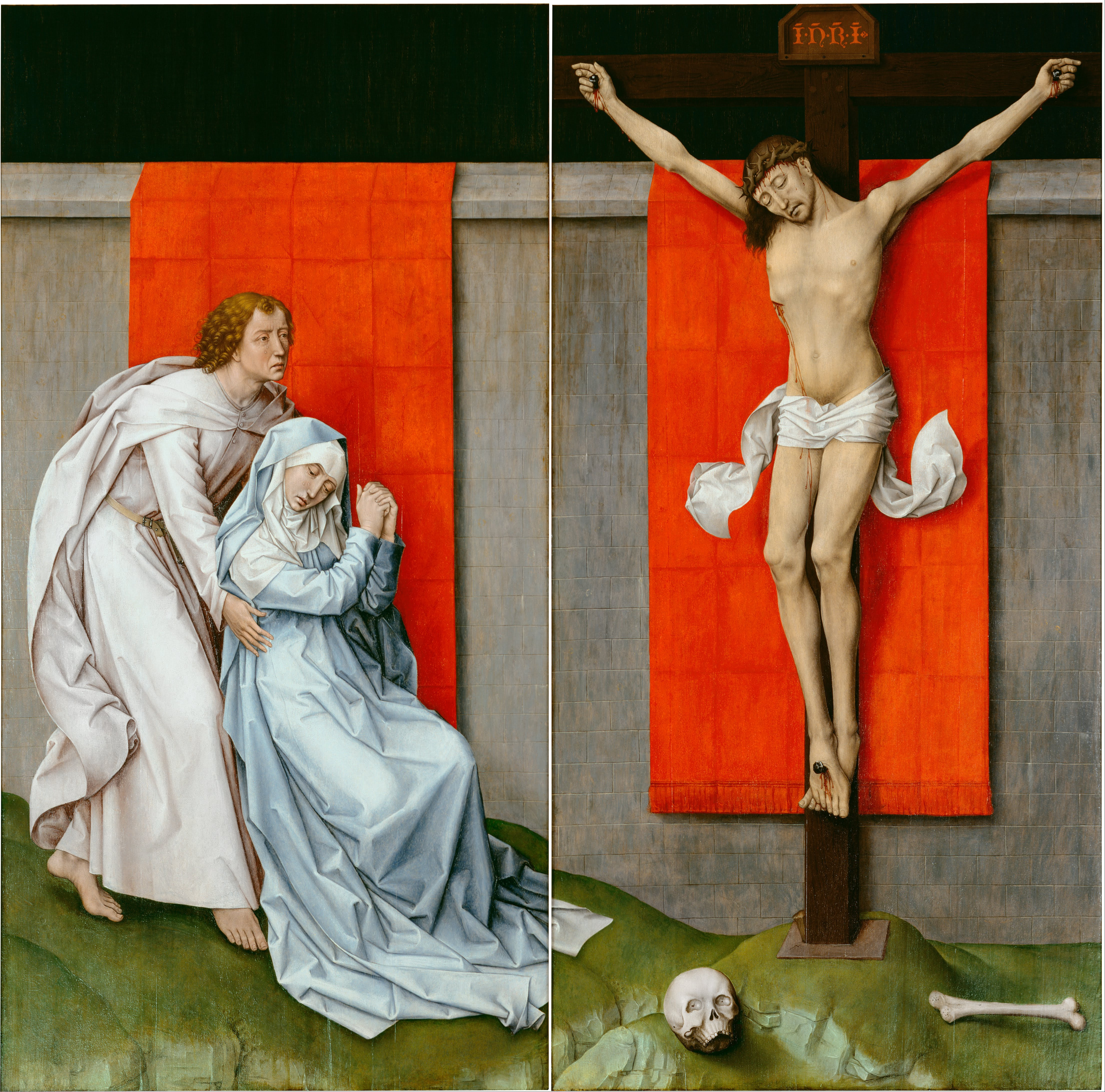
Rogier van der Weyden, Crucifixion Diptych (c. 1460). Oil on oak panels. Left panel: 180.3 × 93.8 cm (71.0 × 36.9 in); right panel: 180.3 × 92.6 cm (71.0 × 36.5 in). Philadelphia Museum of Art

Crucifixion Diptych — also known as Philadelphia Diptych, Calvary Diptych, Christ on the Cross with the Virgin and St. John, or The Crucifixion with the Virgin and Saint John the Evangelist Mourning — is a diptych by the Early Netherlandish artist Rogier van der Weyden, completed c. 1460, today in the Philadelphia Museum of Art. The panels are noted for their technical skill, visceral impact and for possessing a physicality and directness unusual for Netherlandish art of the time. The Philadelphia Museum of Art describes this work as the "greatest Old Master painting in the Museum."

The painting's provenance prior to the mid-19th century is unknown. Its extreme starkness has led art historians to theorize that it was created as a devotional work, possibly for a Carthusian monastery. It is not known if the panels comprised a self-contained diptych, two-thirds of a triptych, or originally were a single panel. Some art historians have mentioned that the work seems unbalanced overall and lacking symmetry (which might indicate a missing panel or panels). Recent scholarship proposes that the panels functioned as the outer shutters of a carved altarpiece.

== The panels ==
=== Origin ===
The background to the panels is unknown. Scholars have theorized that they could be the left and center panels of a triptych, that they formed either the wings or shutters of an altarpiece, or that they were intended to decorate an organ case. The train of the Virgin's robe continues onto the right panel, which evidences that the panels were intended to stand side-by-side rather than separated (as the wings of an altarpiece would have been). Art historian E. P. Richardson proposed that they were the center panel of the lost Cambrai altarpiece (executed between 1455 and 1459), a single painting now split into two parts.

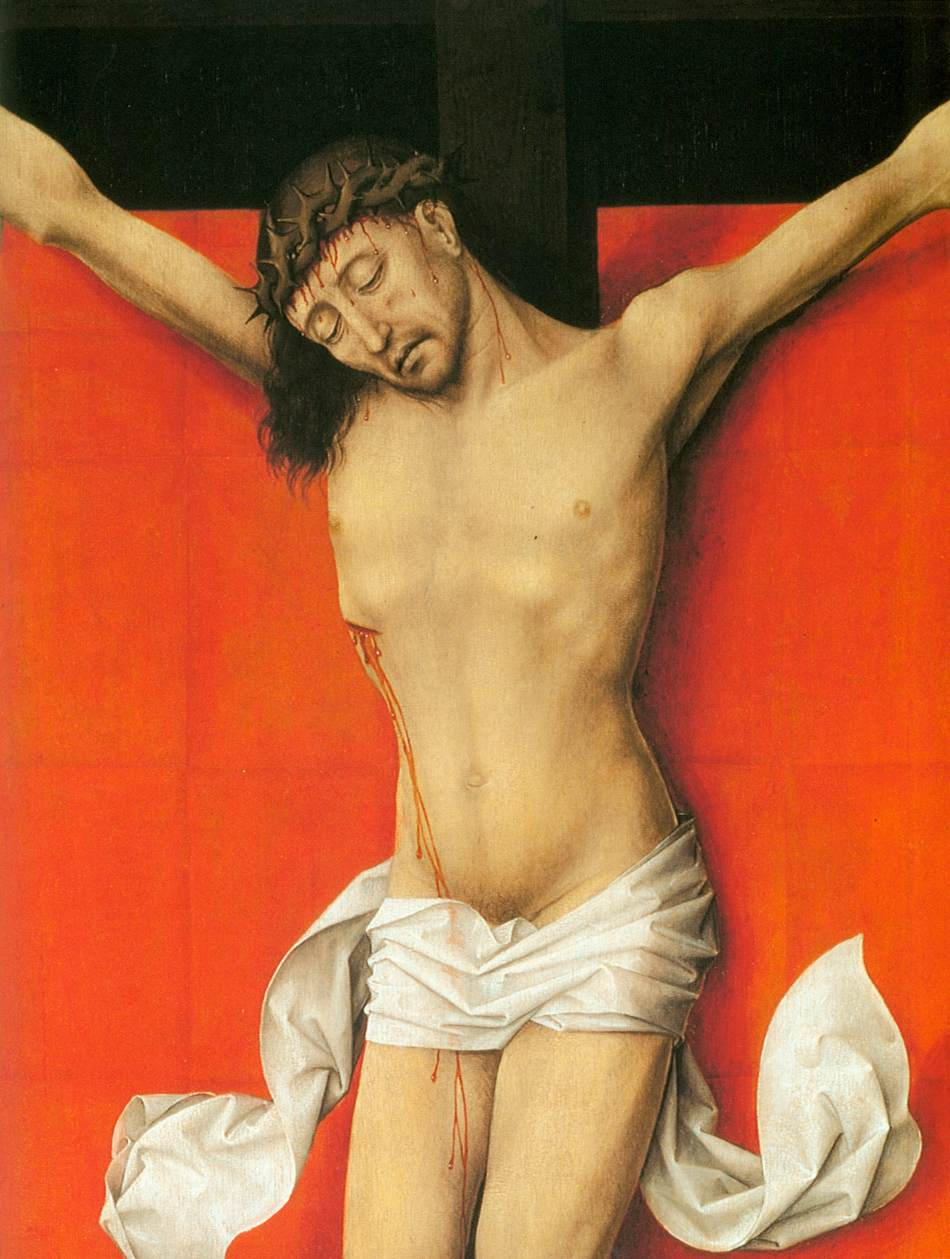
Detail of right panel.

Art historian Penny Howell Jolly was the first to propose that the diptych was painted for an unnamed Carthusian monastery. Carthusians lived a severely ascetic existence: absolute silence, isolation in one's cell except for daily Mass and Vespers, a communal meal only on Sundays and festival days, bread and water on Mondays, Wednesdays and Fridays, clothes and bedding of the coarsest materials. Van der Weyden's son Cornelis entered the Carthusian Monastery of Herrines about 1449, and was invested in the order in 1450. The artist donated money and paintings to the order during his lifetime, and made a bequest to it in his will. His only daughter Margaretha became a Dominican nun. Art historian Dirk de Vos describes the diptych as a "monastically inspired devotional painting" whose composition was "largely determined by the ascetic worship of the Carthusians and Dominicans."

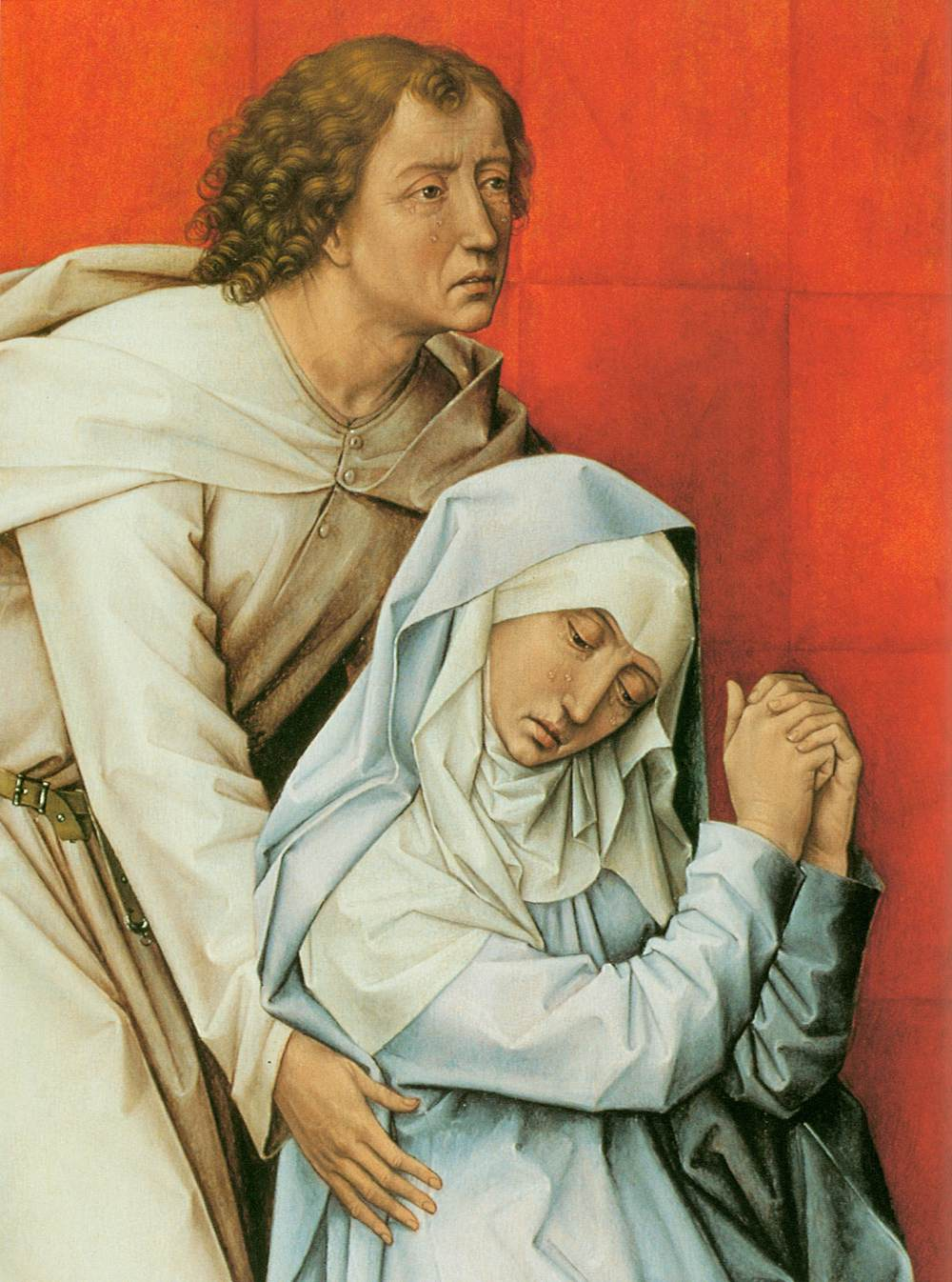
Detail of the Mary and St. John panel.

In a paper presented at the 2006 convention of the Historians of Netherlandish Art, Philadelphia Museum of Art conservator Mark S. Tucker observed that the wooden panels were unusually thin. Across the back of each, he found a horizontal line of dowel holes near the base, which strongly indicated a now-missing structural member. He compared this with similar joinery on the shutters of altarpieces, and theorized that the diptych represented two panels of a four-panel work – either the two-panelled left shutter of an altarpiece, or its center two panels. Based on pictorial style, Tucker argued that the large size of the human figures relative to the size of the panels was more in keeping with figures on the shutters of carved altarpieces than painted ones. He also noted that the shutters of carved altarpieces tend to de-emphasize the deep perspective commonly seen in painted altarpieces, which was consistent with the shallow pictorial space of the diptych.

=== Description ===
The diptych's figures are almost two-thirds life size. The right panel depicts a deliberately unnaturalistic Crucifixion scene. Christ's blood is visible on his hands, feet and brow, and trickles down from the wound in his side. The impression of blood is amplified by the brilliant red cloth of honor draped behind him. The body hangs heavily from the arms, forming a Y-shaped figure against the T-shape of the cross and the rectangle of the cloth. The skull and bone at the foot of the Cross refer to Adam, the first man created by God in Judaism, Christianity and Islam. Christ's loincloth flutters in the wind, indicating the moment of death.

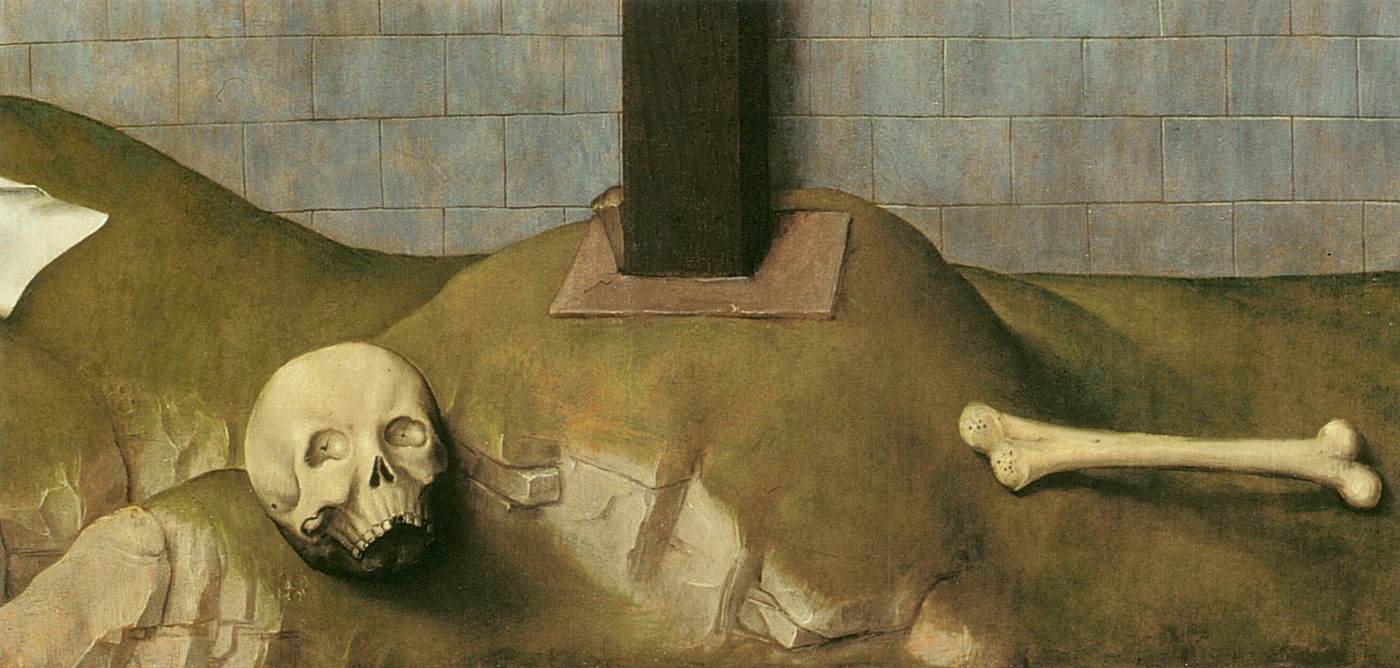
Detail showing the skull and bone at the base of the cross.

The left panel shows a swooning Virgin Mary supported by Saint John the Evangelist. Both are dressed in pale folded robes, and again presented before a draped red cloth of honor (which, given the creases, appears to have been recently unfolded). The high stone wall gives the effect of pushing the figures into the foreground. The dark sky conforms with scripture: (Matthew 27:45: "Now from the sixth hour [noon] there was darkness over all the land unto the ninth hour [3:00 pm]." King James Bible, Cambridge edition.) The dark sky, stark wall, cool light and bare ground contribute to the painting's austerity.

In his first masterpiece, The Descent from the Cross (c. 1435–40), van der Weyden likened the Virgin Mary's suffering during the Crucifixion to Christ's by having her collapse in a pose that mirrored that of his body being removed from the Cross. In the Philadelphia painting, the faces of the Virgin Mary and Christ mirror each other, as do their positions at the center of the red cloths.

The diptych was executed late in the artist's life, and is unique among paintings of the early Northern Renaissance in its utilization of a flat unnaturalistic background to stage figures which are yet, typically highly detailed. Nonetheless, the contrast of vivid primary reds and whites serves to achieve an emotional effect typical of van der Weyden's best work.

== Escorial Crucifixion ==
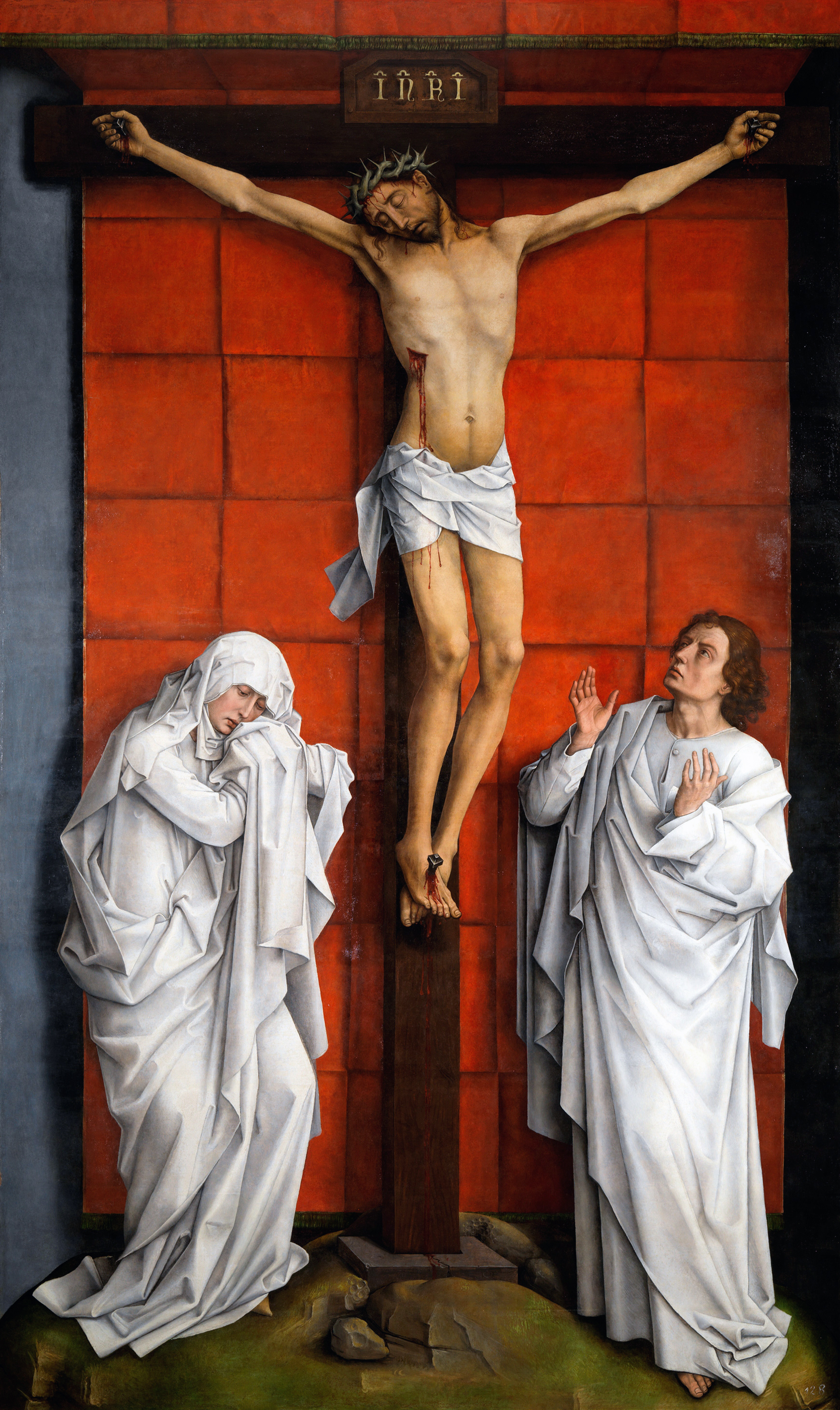
Crucifixion with the Virgin and St. John (c. 1460), Rogier van der Weyden, Escorial Palace, Madrid.

The diptych is most closely related to van der Weyden's Crucifixion with the Virgin and St. John (c. 1450–55) at the Escorial Palace in Madrid. The Escorial Crucifixion also presents Christ on the Cross before a draped red cloth, and there are similarities in the other figures. Van der Weyden painted this for and donated it to the Carthusian monastery in Scheut, near Brussels. Philip II of Spain bought it from the monastery in 1555, and installed it in a chapel in Segovia, before moving it to the Escorial in 1574. The diptych's figures are almost two-thirds life size; those in the towering Escorial painting are fully life size.

In her master's thesis exploring the influence of Carthusian theology on van der Weyden's Escorial Crucifixion and Crucifixion Diptych, Tamytha Cameron Smith argues that the two works "are visually unique" in the artist's oeuvre, "because of their extreme starkness, simplicity and tendency toward abstraction." The traditional deep blue of the Virgin's robe and dark red of St. John's robe have been bleached out, leaving the garments near white (the color of Carthusian robes). Smith notes the "overwhelming stillness" of the diptych, and speculates that it may have been van der Weyden's last work.

In Vita Christi (1374) the Carthusian theologian Ludolph of Saxony introduced the concept of immersing and projecting oneself into a Biblical scene from the life of Christ. Ludolph described St. John as steadfastly loyal to Christ, but also "adorned with the brilliancy and beauty conferred by chastity." If the Philadelphia diptych was utilized as a Ludolphian devotional painting (as the Escorial Crucifixion certainly was), a monk could have empathized with the suffering of Christ and the Virgin, but also been able to project himself into the scene as the ever-loyal (and ever-chaste) St. John. With this intended function, van der Weyden's decision to strip away the extraneous detail present in his other Crucifixions can be seen as having had both an artistic and a practical purpose.

== Conservation ==
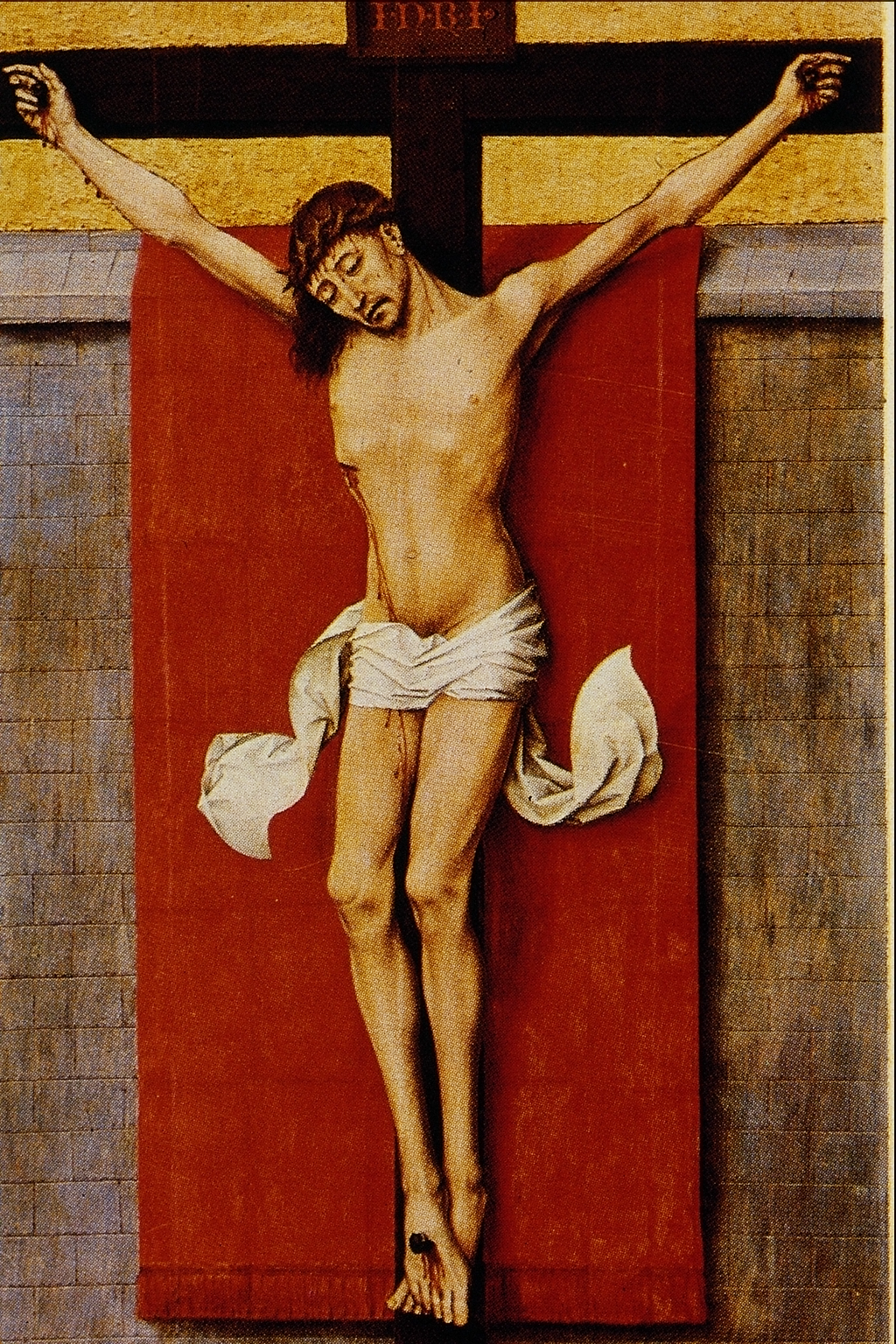
Detail of right panel, with the gold sky that was added in 1941.

The painting was conserved by freelance restorer David Rosen in 1941, under the supervision of Johnson Collection curator Henri Gabriel Marceau. Near the upper edge of a panel Rosen found gold paint, one of the factors that led him to conclude that the blue-black sky was an 18th-century addition. Rosen scraped away the dark paint and added a gilded sky, which was how the diptych was exhibited for half a century.

Examination of the painting in 1990 by Philadelphia Museum of Art conservator Mark S. Tucker showed little justification for this change. The traces of gold were minimal, and could have been residue from a gold-leafed frame. Chemical analysis established that the surviving vestiges of blue pigment in the sky contained azurite of the same color and composition as blue pigment in the Virgin's robe, which was indisputably original. Tucker undertook a thorough cleaning and (reversible) restoration, 1992–93, painting over the gold, since Rosen's 1941 restoration had removed almost all of the sky's original paint.

The 1992–93 restoration has led to new insight about the artist. Van der Weyden's broad massing of color in the blue-black sky was something new in Northern Renaissance art, although common in Italian frescoes. The diptych's innovative composition and almost abstract use of color may represent his synthesis of the Italian art that he saw on his 1450 pilgrimage to Rome.

== Provenance ==
The provenance of the painting, as far as it is known, is as follows:

- 1856, Madrid. Catalogue of the collection of José de Madrazo, nos. 659 & 660.
- June 1867, Paris. Auction of the collection of M. le Mis de Salamanca, lots 165 & 166.
- About 1905, Paris. Art dealer F. Kleinberger sells the "Christ on the Cross" panel to Peter A. B. Widener, and the "Virgin and St. John" panel to John G. Johnson.
- 1906, Philadelphia, United States. Johnson purchases Widener's panel and reunites the halves. Exhibited in Johnson's house museum at 510 South Broad Street, Philadelphia.
- April 1917, Philadelphia. Johnson dies. The diptych becomes part of his bequest to the City of Philadelphia.
- June 1933, Philadelphia. The Johnson Collection is moved to the Philadelphia Museum of Art.

== Gallery ==
Four other Crucifixion paintings have been attributed to van der Weyden:

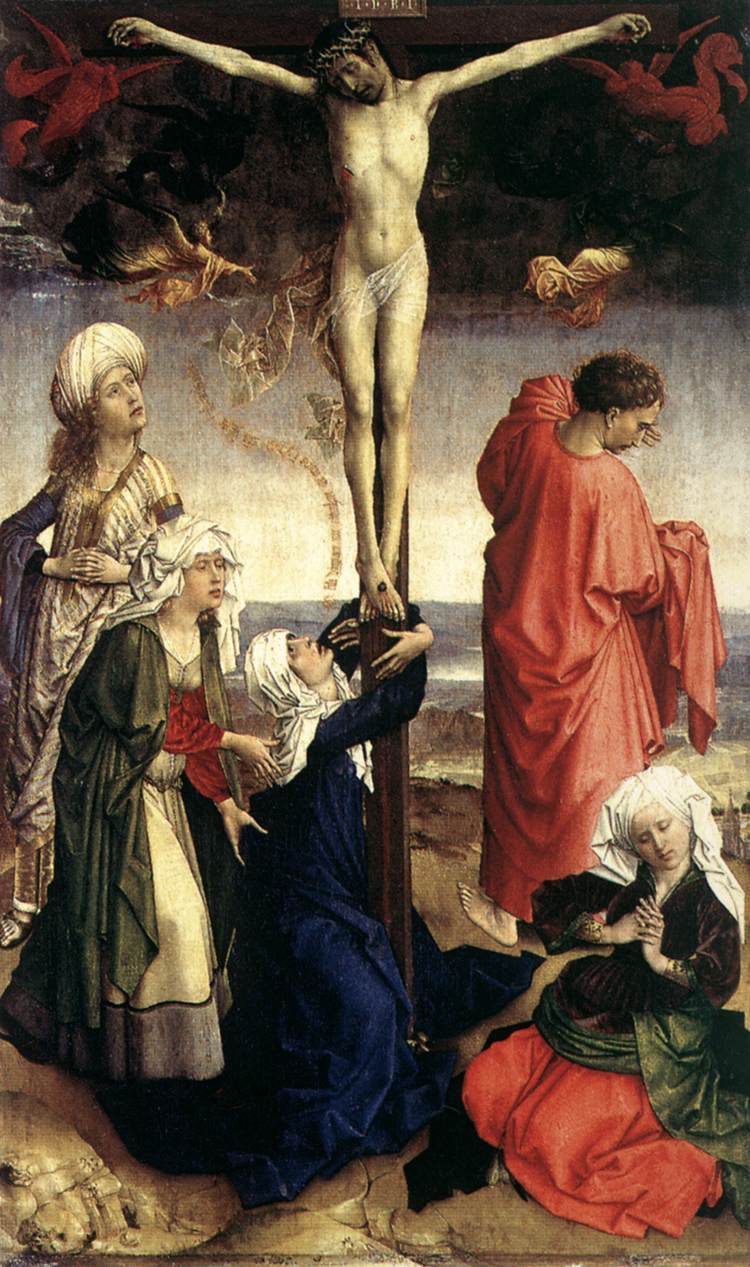
The Crucifixion (c. 1425–1430), Gemäldegalerie, Berlin.

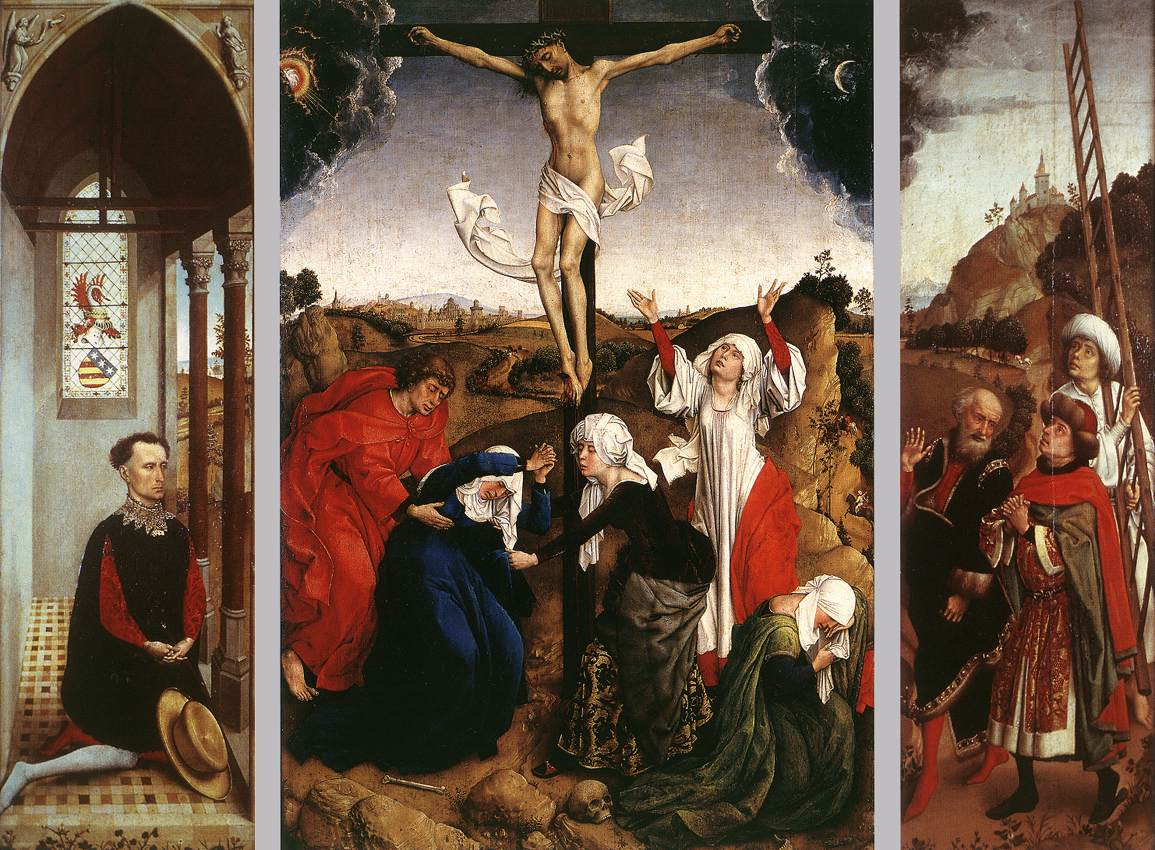
Abegg Triptych (c. 1438–1440), Abegg-Stiftung, Riggisberg.

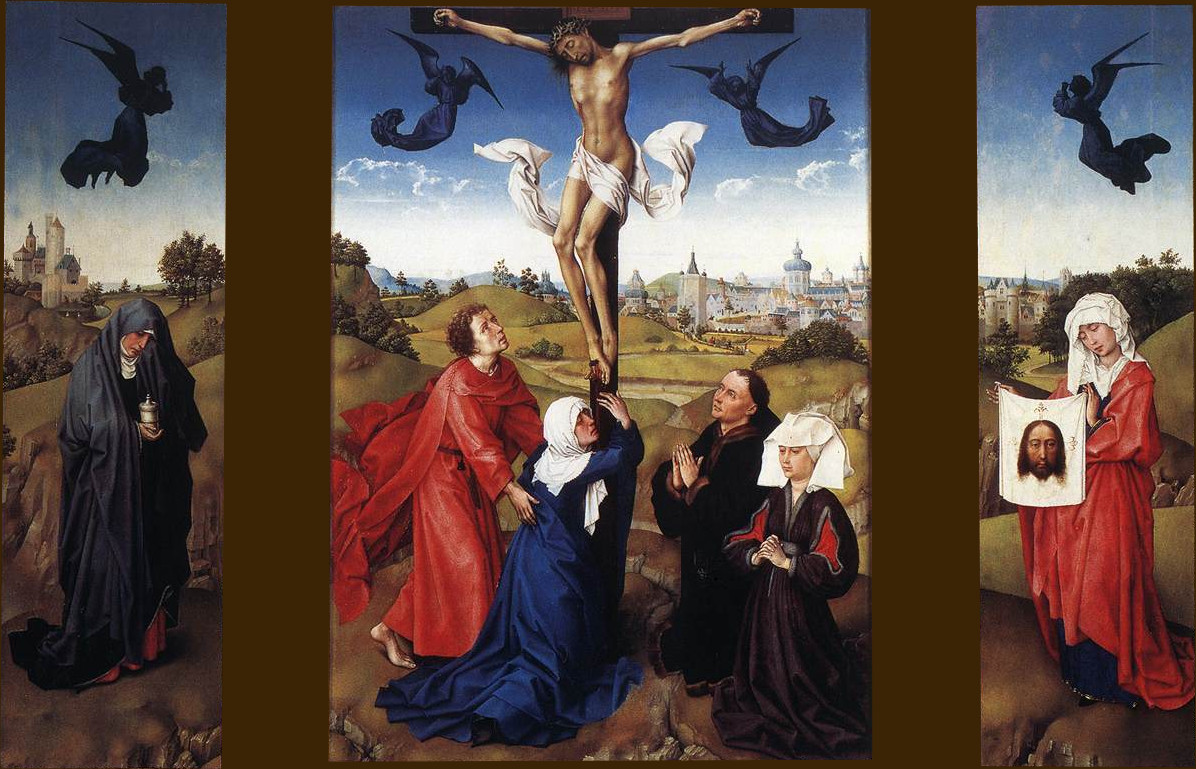
Crucifixion Triptych (c. 1440–1445), Kunsthistorisches Museum, Vienna.

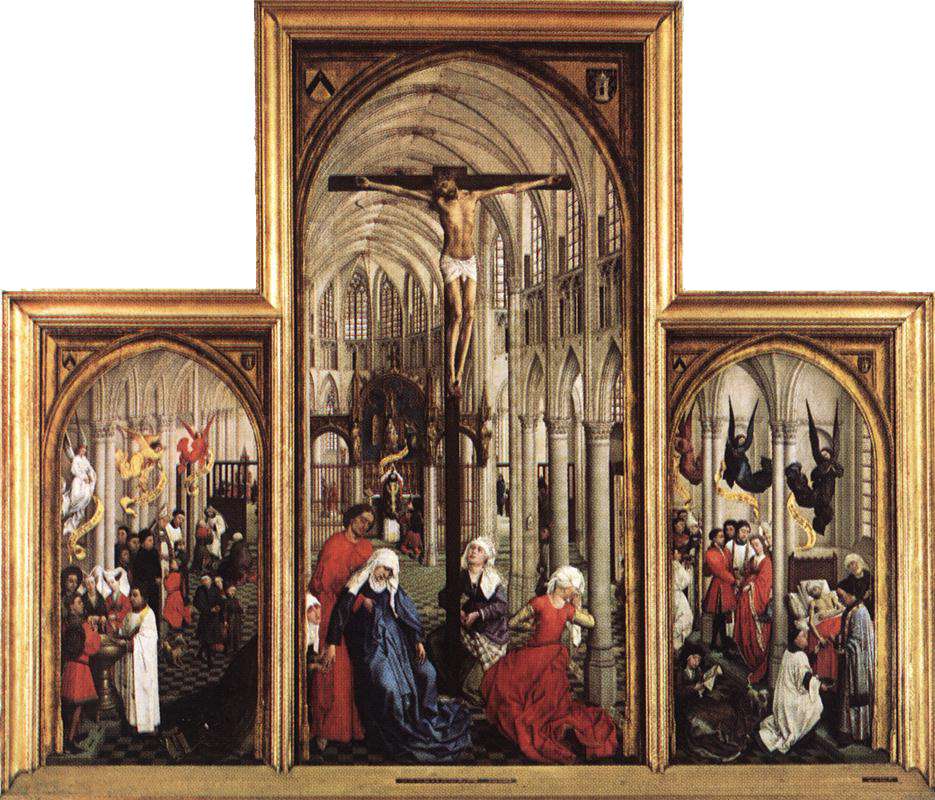
Triptych of the Seven Sacraments (c. 1440–1445), Royal Museum of Fine Arts, Antwerp.

== See also ==
- List of works by Rogier van der Weyden

== Sources ==
- de Vos, Dirk. Rogier van der Weyden: The Complete Works. Harry N Abrams, 2000. ISBN 0-8109-6390-6
- Jolly, P. H. "Rogier van der Weyden's Escorial and Philadelphia Crucifixions and their Relation to Fra Angelico at San Marco." Oud Holland, 95, 1981.
- Marrow, James H. "Symbol and Meaning in Northern European Art of the Late Middle Ages and the Early Renaissance". Simiolus: Netherlands Quarterly for the History of Art, Volume 16, No. 2/3, 1986. 150-169
- Philadelphia Museum of Art. John G. Johnson Collection: Catalogue of Flemish and Dutch Paintings. Philadelphia: George H. Buchanan Co., 1972. (Johnson Catalogue 1972).
- Smith, Tamytha Cameron. Personal Passions and Carthusian Influences Evident in Rogier van der Weyden's Crucified Christ between the Virgin and Saint John and Diptych of the Crucifixion. University of North Texas, May 2006.
- Tucker, Mark. "Rogier van der Weyden's Philadelphia 'Crucifixion'." The Burlington Magazine, 139/1135, October 1997. 676-83.
- Tucker, Mark. New Findings on the Function of Rogier van der Weyden's Philadelphia Crucifixion. Archived 2012-02-26 at the Wayback Machine Paper presented at 2006 world convention of Historians of Netherlandish Art, Baltimore/Washington, D.C.
- Valentiner, W. R. Catalogue of a Collection of Paintings and Some Art Objects, Volume II. 1914. (Johnson Catalogue 1914).
