= Visitation (van der Weyden) =

c. 1445 painting by Rogier van der Weyden

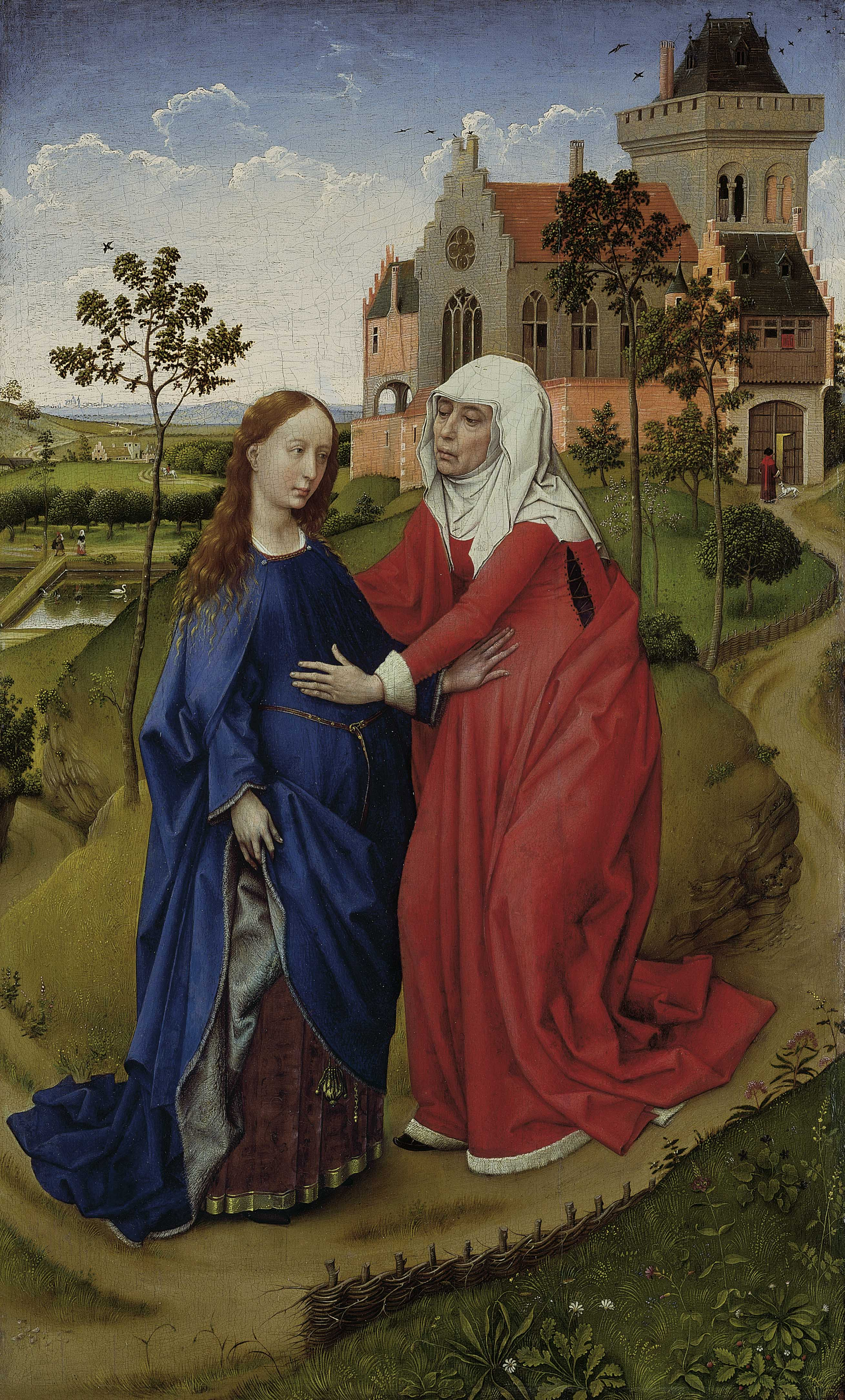
- Artist: Rogier van der Weyden
- Year: c.1445
- Medium: oil on panel
- Location: Museum der bildenden Künste, Leipzig
- Owner: Museum der bildenden Kunste

Visitation is a c.1445 oil on panel painting of the Visitation by Rogier van der Weyden, now in the Museum der bildenden Künste in Leipzig. It is linked to Luke 1:40.

== Composition ==
Mary's posture is used to symbolize her status as the Mother of Christ. The view behind Mary is panoramic, suggesting that she has walked a long distance. Mary's posture is straight, in comparison to Elizabeth, who has her knee slightly bent towards the ground. Both of the women have a hand placed upon the stomach of the other. Near the door of the mansion, Zachary, the husband of Elizabeth, plays with a dog.

== See also ==
- List of works by Rogier van der Weyden
