= Saint Hubert Altarpiece =

Altarpiece by Rogier van der Weyden and his studio

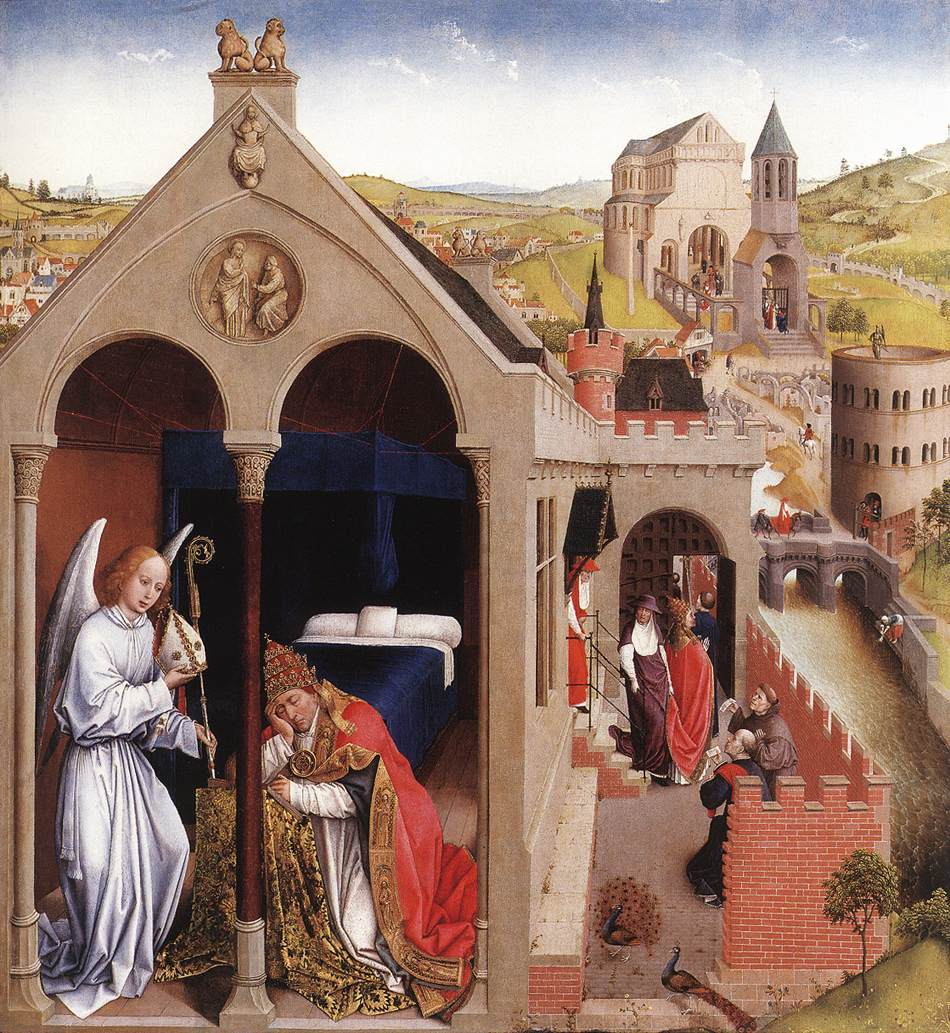
Dream of Pope Sergius

The Saint Hubert Altarpiece was a late 1430s altarpiece in the Chapel of St Hubert in the church of St Gudule, Brussels by Rogier van der Weyden and his studio. Its central image is lost but its side panels are thought to be The Dream of Pope Sergius (J. Paul Getty Museum) and The Exhumation of St Hubert (National Gallery, London) - In around 1623 Dubuisson-Aubenay recorded seeing a two-part painting in that church which matches the description of these two panels.

== Dream ==
The main scene shows an angel appearing to Pope Sergius I in his sleep, informing him of the murder of Lambert and that Hubertus should succeed him as bishop of Maastricht. In the background is the pope granting Hubertus the bishop's staff and mitre. By 1796 this panel had been acquired by Frederick Ponsonby, 3rd Earl of Bessborough and it was sold from his collection in 1850. It remained in the United Kingdom until 1924, when it was in the ownership of the Kleinberger Galleries in New York. It is still in the US and was bought by its present owner in 1972.

== Exhumation ==
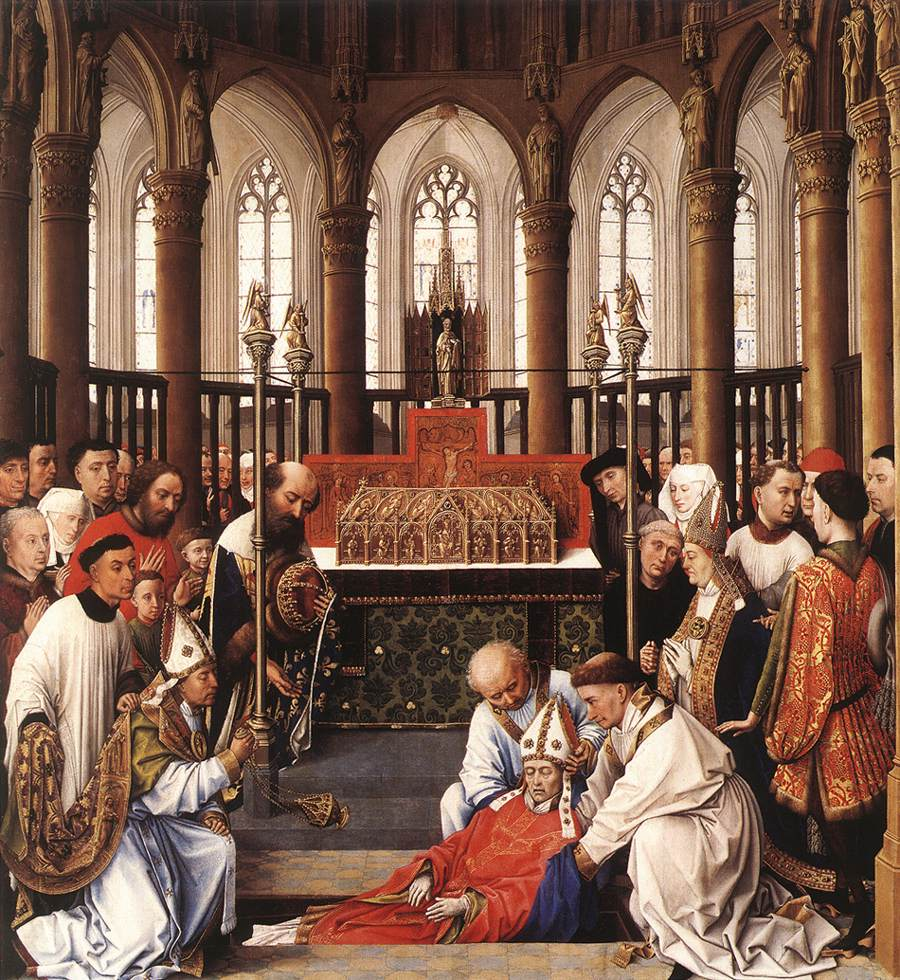
Exhumation of St Hubert

It shows the saint's incorrupt body being disinterred from St Peter's Church in Liège in 825 for translation to Angadium Abbey. On the left Walcaud, Bishop of Liège, kneels to cense the tomb, with Louis the Pious standing behind him, holding his crown in his hand. To the right, also kneeling and mitred, is Hadbold, Archbishop of Cologne. The work was bought by its present owners in 1868.

== See also ==
- List of works by Rogier van der Weyden
