= Crucifixion Triptych =

Altarpiece by Rogier van der Weyden

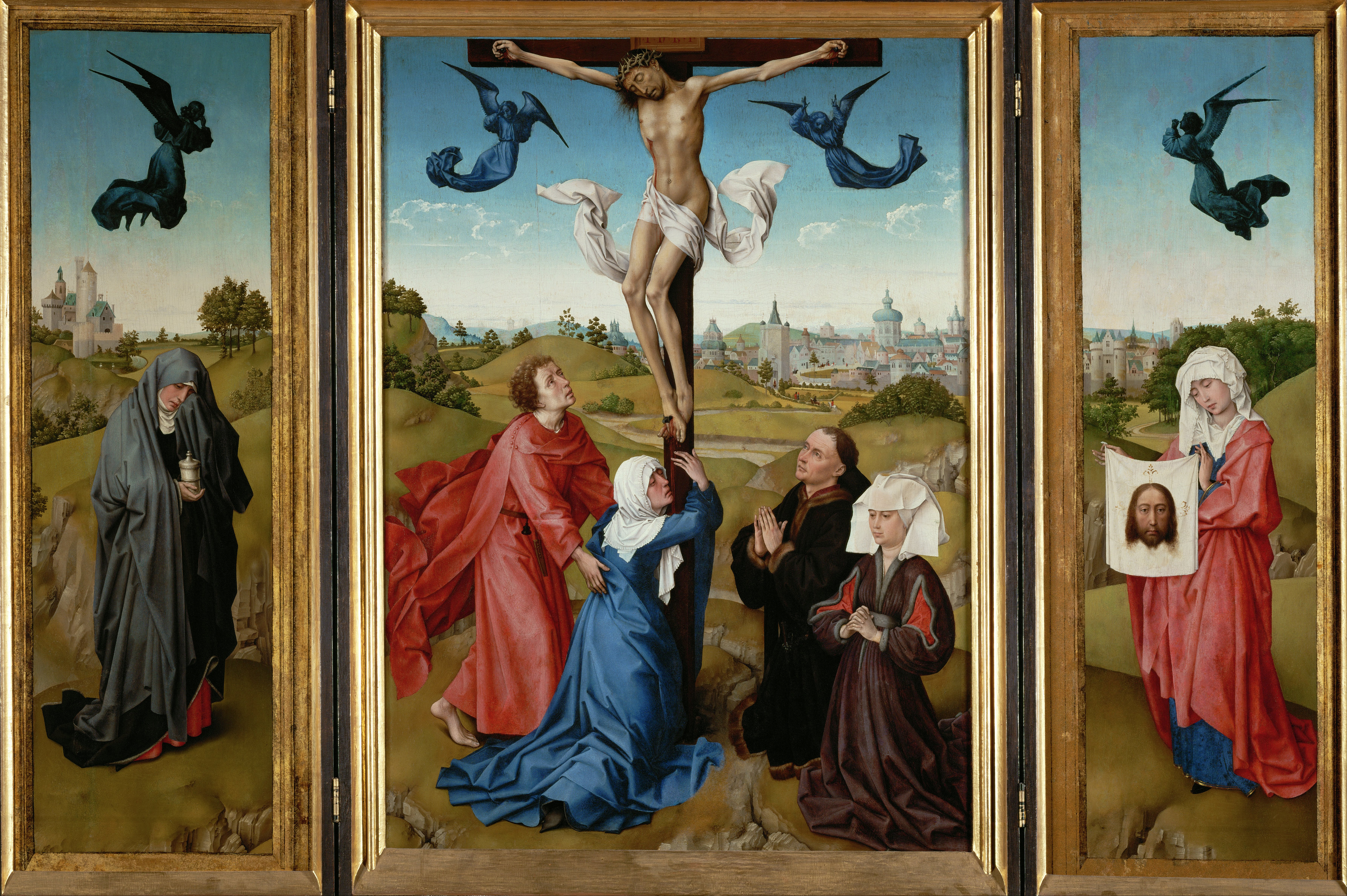
- Year: c. 1443–1445
- Location: Kunsthistorisches Museum, Vienna

The Crucifixion Triptych is a painted altarpiece of c. 1443–1445 by Rogier van der Weyden, now in the Kunsthistorisches Museum in Vienna. The central scene shows the Crucifixion of Christ, with the Virgin Mary embracing the foot of the cross as she mourns. John the Evangelist is depicted in the red robe, placing his hand on her back in comfort and the painting's two donors kneeling to the right. On the left-hand side panel isolated is Mary Magdalene, while on the right side panel is Saint Veronica holding an image of Christ. A unified landscape background across all three panels shows a skyline Jerusalem in the distance.

== Description ==
This piece was made with the intention of becoming a triptych, despite that it was painted as one panel piece and then later cut. This initial choice to create this triptych style was intentional because van der Weyden had painted delicate golden frames onto the paintings themselves.

Centrally depicted between the two side wings, is the Crucifixion scene. Mother Mary is shown wearing lapis blue and a pure white head covering. To her left shown consoling her is Saint John, wearing a vibrant red covering gazing up towards Jesus on the cross.

The two figures to the right of the cross below Jesus's feet are the patrons, separated only by a small crack in the earth. This depiction separates the worldly from the heavenly while still encompassing them into the scene. This provided an ability for the viewer and patron to create a prayer aid to make it easier to place the viewer into mentally see themselves and experience the scene.

== Stylistic choices ==
Van der Weyden, a Flemish painter, painted this image in a typical Northern Renaissance style. The Virgin Mary for example, is shown gripping the cross below Jesus's pierced and bloody feet. Mary is shown here with intense emotions, caressing her cheek against the bloody wood as she mourns. Her arms grip around the cross and the weight of her sorrow is depicted in the falling motion of her body. Mary's face is flushed red, tears rolling down her face as she mourns. This intensification of emotion is distinctive of the Northern style.

Mary Magdalene depicted on the left panel piece is shown isolated and sorrowfully looking down whilst she holds a small jar. The jar holds ointment for Christ's feet. On the right, Veronica is depicted holding the cloth is believed to wipe the face of Christ when he was carrying the cross to his crucifixion. Her veil has an image of Jesus's face painted in an idealistic style and is thought to have magically appeared as she displays it for the viewer. She holds this cloth with poise and softness. Her face is angled downward to look at his face on her veil and mourn.

Van der Weyden's northern style of painting emphasizes a distinct focus on the precision in his depictions. His depictions have a focus on intense emotion illustrated in a hyperrealist fashion. He was influenced by Robert Campin's workshop in many ways and adapted that into his paintings while also developing his own sense of style. This demonstrates Van Der Weyden's ability to create an independent style separate from the influence of Campin's in this painting.

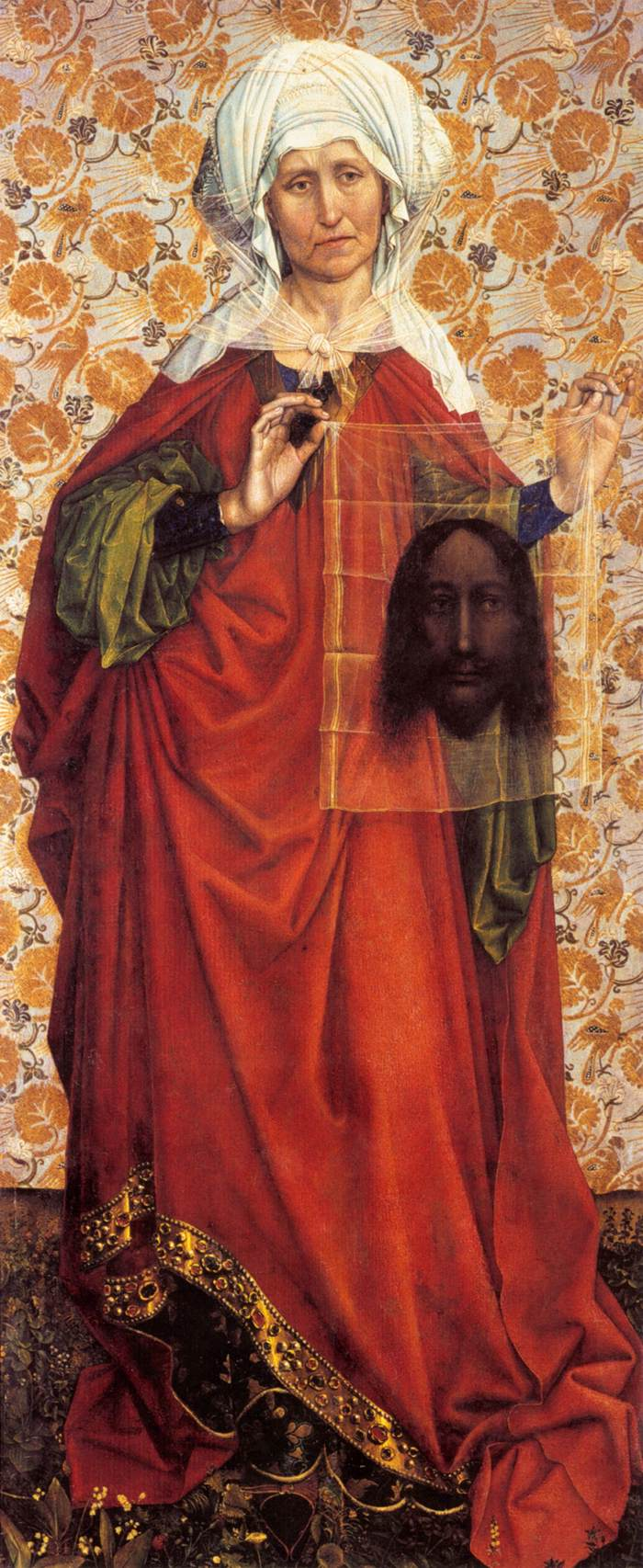
Robert Campin - St.Veronica

Van der Weyden's own style is shown in this version of the Crucifixion in portrayal of St. Veronica. He makes a conscious and distinctively different decision in his depiction of Mary Magdalene and St. Veronica. St. Veronica is commonly depicted as older, displaying physical features of aging like wrinkles, but that is not done in this rendering. She is shown here on the right holding the cloth marked with the True Image of God and no visible signs of excessive aging. Her skin is clear and smooth as she holds her cloth with such gentle grace and poise. This depiction of youth is more commonly seen with the depiction of Mary Magdalene. On the left side of the Crucifixion triptych by Van der Weyden he made another independent decision to illustrate the Magdalene isolated and slightly aged to look older. This depiction of Mary Magdalene is also something Van Der Weyden would claim as distinctively his style in this painting. He has established his style in this image by opposing traditional depictions of these two women.

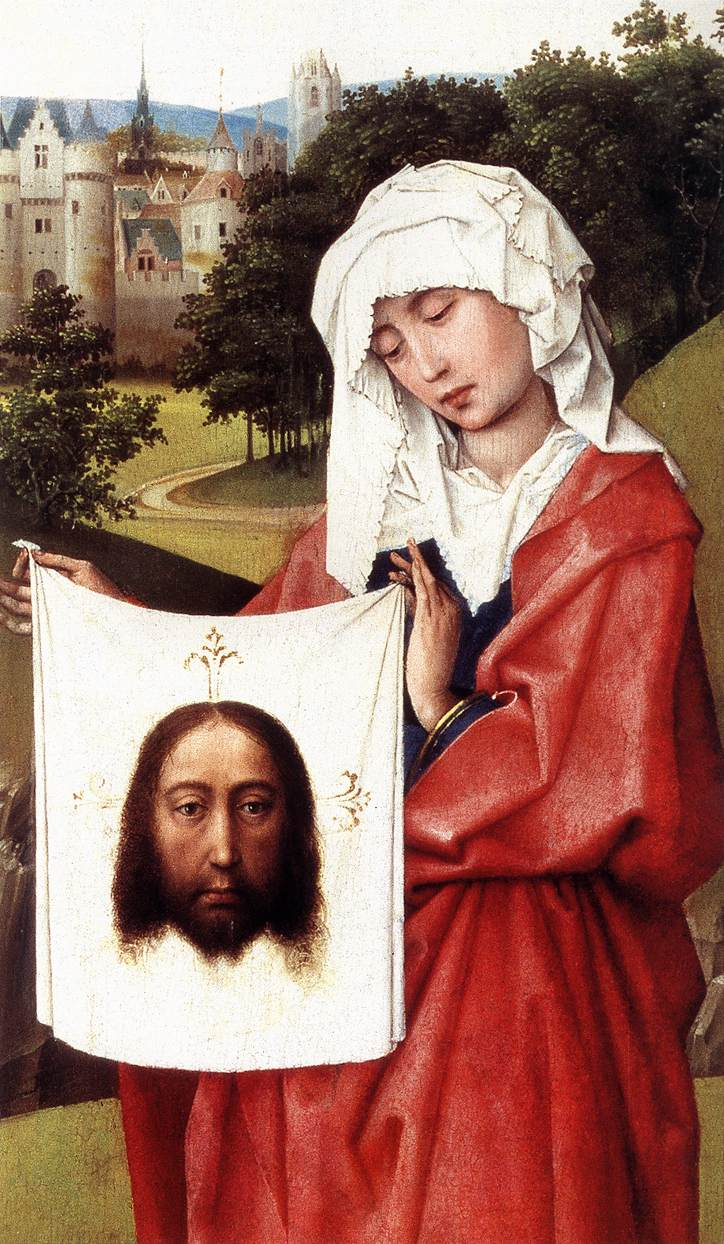
Rogier van der Weyden - St. veronica, Crucifixion Triptych

== Biblical iconography ==
This painting depicts the usual Crucifixion iconography. The most notable characteristic is Christ being nailed to a cross, in this image wearing only a loincloth. This cloth is made from simplistic fabrics, rarely ever expensive. It is shown flowing in an angelic-like pattern appearing almost as if its floating. This unrealistic movement is to signal to the viewer that he is otherworldly or of heavenly. He is depicted here with soft, pale and supple skin; his body appears to be so thin almost in a malnourished state.

== Symbolism ==
This image is believed to hold great symbolism in its landscape of Jerusalem from the green rolling hills to the gradient blue sky. The gradient sky reflects the dark navy blue back onto the angels flying on the same plane as Jesus's upper body. The angels' position depict them as being closer to the heavens and above all that is earthly. This representation of Christ's body on the cross at the moment of crucifixion, next to the landscape, connects the heavily to the earthly. The crucifixion symbolizes the salvation and eternal forgiveness Christ has achieved for those connected to earth. Having Jesus depicted in this way demonstrates a oneness between the patrons and Christ, allowing the image to become a prayer aid.

Blood is emitted from the wound in his side of his elongated body. His proportions are anatomically correct and his body is elongated to exaggerate his scale to one more grand. The floating loin cloth, flowing angelically and defying the laws of gravity, symbolizes his connection to the heavens, or his other worldly powers.

== Patronage ==
The exact patronage of this piece is unknown. However, considering that Van Der Weyden was known to be the official painter of the court in Brussels, having inherited Jan Van Eyck's painting position, it is possible that the patron was someone connected to the court, perhaps a member of the bourgeoisie, nobles, or courtiers.

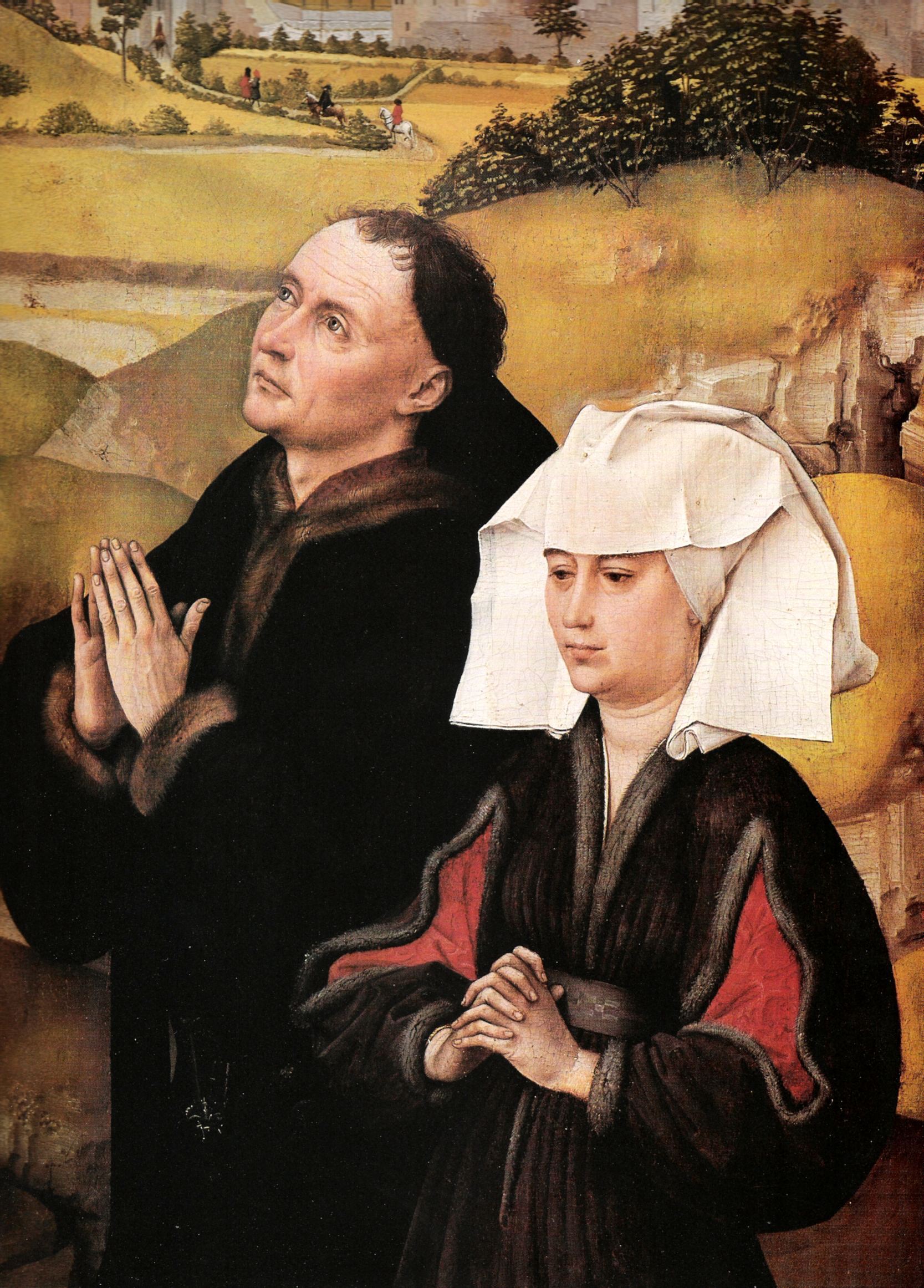
Crucifixion Triptych - Patrons Rogier Van Der Weyden

The two donors are shown on the right of the cross. Still depicted in the central frame of the triptych, they are shown separated from the main scene only by a physical crack in the earth. This separation is meant to signal to the viewer that there is still a distinction from the holy or otherworldly and create a clear separation between the holy scene and their earthly connection. The male donor engages in the physical action of gazing towards the scene of the Crucifixion itself, while the female donor is engaging in an inner spiritual experience of the holy scene.

== See also ==
- List of works by Rogier van der Weyden
