= Saint Jerome and the Lion (van der Weyden) =

Painting by Rogier van der Weyden

St Jerome and the Lion
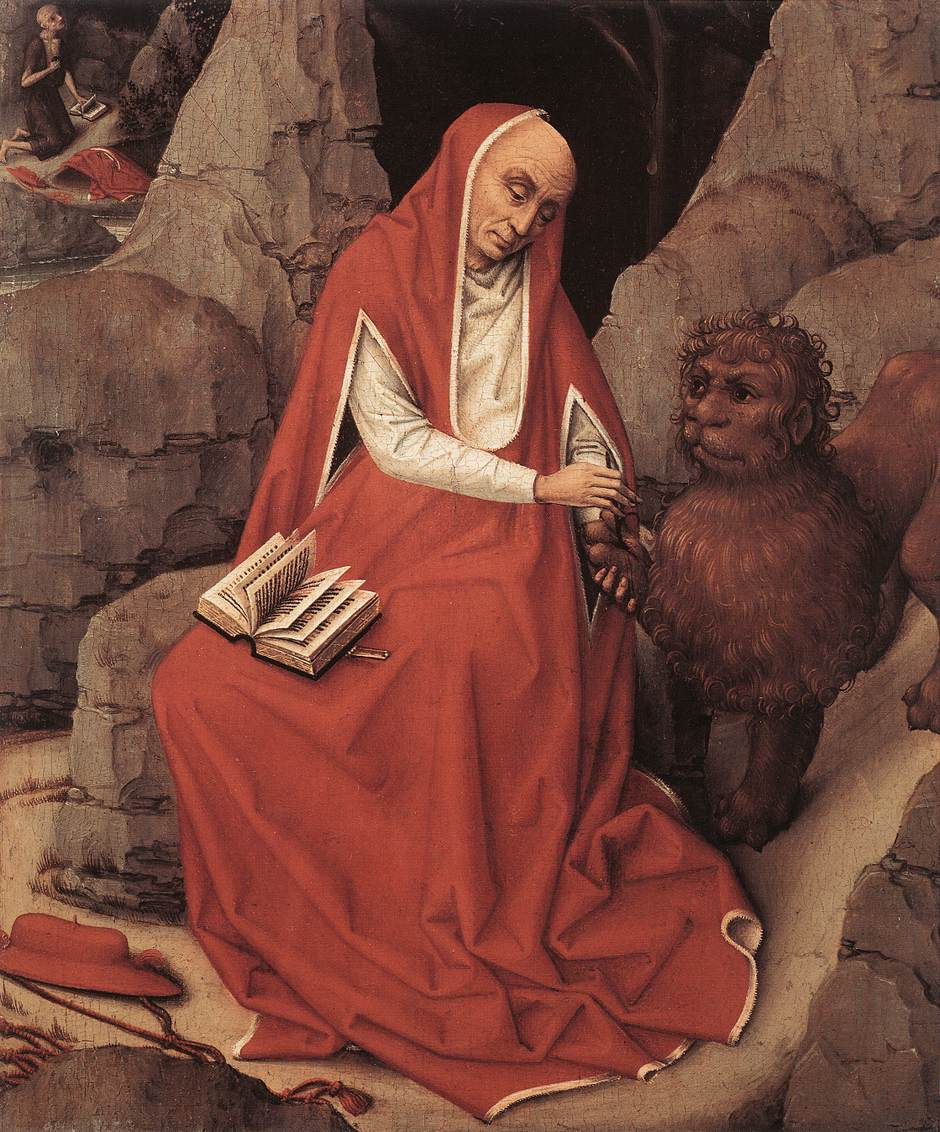
- Artist: Rogier van der Weyden or studio
- Year: c. 1450
- Medium: oil on oak panel
- Dimensions: 30.8 cm × 25.2 cm (12 1/8 in × 9 15/16 in)
- Location: Detroit Institute of Arts

St. Jerome and the Lion (also known as St. Jerome Extracting the Thorn or Saint Jerome in the Desert) is an oil on oak panel painting by Rogier van der Weyden or his studio from c. 1450–1465, showing Jerome and a lion. It is now in the Detroit Institute of Arts. This painting was part of a renewed interest in depictions of St. Jerome.

== Description ==
The painting depicts a scene from the legend of St. Jerome. In the legend St. Jerome is said to be giving a lecture to his students in Bethlehem when a limping lion came to him. While the others fled, the saint welcomed the lion. He examined the injured foot and extracted the thorn he found there. This cured the foot and the lion stayed with St. Jerome until his death.

St. Jerome is depicted as an old man in a cardinal's outfit. The traditional red garments are lined with white fur and the galero sits by his side. A book lies open on his lap. St. Jerome is seated on a rock outside of a cave and is turning towards the lion to attend to his paw. The saint also appears in the upper left corner of the painting. This image of Jerome shows him in prayer with his eyes raised to the heavens and a hand resting on the open pages of a book, likely the Scriptures. His cardinal's gown is discarded on the ground beside him and the saint is instead clothed in a hair shirt.

Rogier's painting created an archetype for depictions of St. Jerome and inspired a series of paintings, sculptures, and prints from other artists. This archetype remained popular for about 75 years.

== See also ==
- List of works by Rogier van der Weyden

== Sources ==
- "Saint Jerome in the Desert". Detroit Institute of Arts Museum. 18 April 2017.
- "St Jerome and the Lion by WEYDEN, Rogier van der". Web Gallery of Art, searchable fine arts image database.
