= Portrait of a Woman (van der Weyden) =

Painting by Rogier van der Weyde

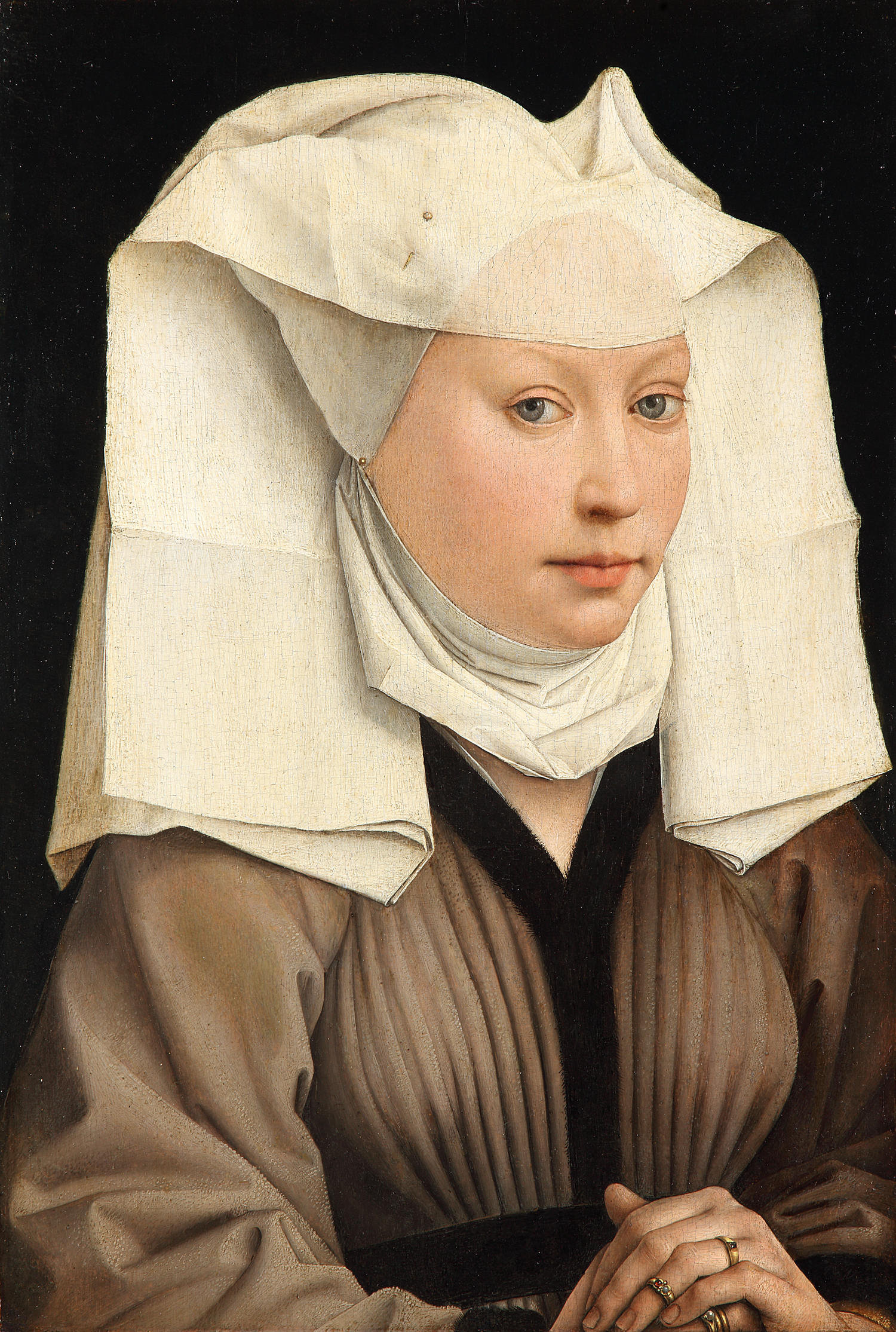
- Artist: Rogier van der Weyden
- Year: c. 1435
- Type: Oil on oak wood
- Dimensions: 47 cm × 32 cm (19 in × 13 in)
- Location: Gemäldegalerie, Staatliche Museen; Berlin

Portrait of a Young Woman (or Lady Wearing a Gauze Headdress) is a painting completed between 1435–1440 by the Netherlandish artist Rogier van der Weyden.

== Description ==
The sitter in this small work wears a wide, white hennin over a brown dress, which features a black-lined, v-shaped neckline. As is usual of van der Weyden's female portraits, her hands are clasped tightly in prayer, while her expression is generally humble. Unusually for a van der Weyden', she does not bow her head or gaze into the middle distance. Instead she looks directly at the viewer, creating an intimate relationship between sitter, viewer and artist, which art historian and research curator Lorne Campbell describes as "appealing and vibrant".

The sitter has unusually bright, large and attractive blue eyes; their rendering may be considered outside of contemporary representation in that the artist did not reduce the size of the sitter's left eye to reflect the scale of her turn of head to the viewer's left. She is lit from a source above the canvas to the viewer's right, which sets up the falling light used to contrast the vivid white of her veil and flesh against the dark tones of her dress and volume of her head.

The painting is composed through a mix of horizontal and vertical lines. The verticals of her head-dress blend into the lines of her shoulders and chest, while the horizontal folds of the veil are set against the line formed by her upper and lower lips. Given the individuality of her features, Rogier was obviously working from a life study of an actual person. Yet there are elements of abstraction in the image. The model is likely a member of the middle class, given her relatively plain dress, matronly features and accentuated breasts. It is widely believed that she was modeled on the artist's wife, Elisabeth Goffaert, though this has not been proven. The portrait is similar to other female portraits by Rogier and Robert Campin. In fact, the similarity between Rogier's and Campin's female portraits is so strong that they were sometimes mis-attributed.

== Provenance ==
The portrait was held in the collection of a Princess Soltikoff in Saint Petersburg until acquired by the Berlin State Museums in 1908. Today it is on display in the Gemäldegalerie, Berlin.

== See also ==
- List of works by Rogier van der Weyden

== Sources ==
- Campbell, Lorne (2004). Van der Weyden. London: Chaucer Press. ISBN 1-904449-24-7.
- Grössinger, Christa (1997). Picturing women in late Medieval and Renaissance art. Manchester: Manchester University Press. ISBN 0-7190-4109-0.
- Kemperdick, Stephan (2006). The Early Portrait, from the Collection of the Prince of Liechtenstein and the Kunstmuseum Basel. Munich: Prestel. ISBN 3-7913-3598-7.
