= Portrait of Antoine, 'Grand Bâtard' of Burgundy =

Painting by Rogier van der Weyden

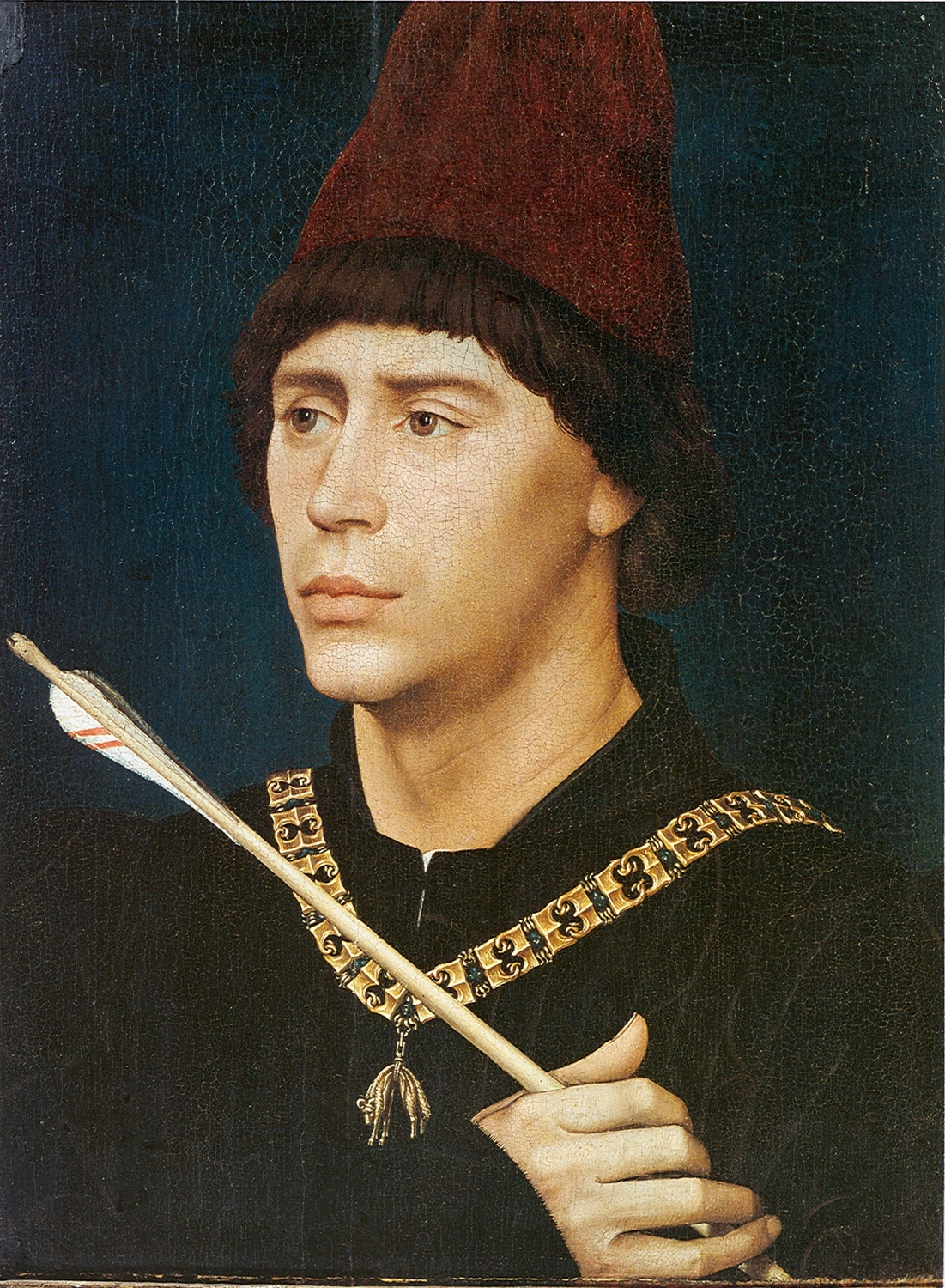
Portrait of Antoine, 'Grand Bâtard' of Burgundy, Rogier van der Weyden, oil on wood panel, 19 cm × 28.5 cm. Royal Museums of Fine Arts of Belgium, Belgium.

Portrait of Antoine, 'Grand Bâtard' of Burgundy (or Portrait of Anthony of Burgundy) is an oil panel painting by the Netherlandish painter Rogier van der Weyden portraying Anthony of Burgundy, the bastard son of Philip the Good and one of his mistresses, Jeanne de Presle. The panel is dated to about 1460 and held in the Royal Museums of Fine Arts of Belgium, Belgium.

It is one of three high-profile van der Weyden portraits commissioned by the Dukes of Burgundy around 1460. The other two are his portraits of Philip the Good and Charles the Bold. In common with most of van der Weyden's male portraits, Antoine is shown half profile staring aloofly into the middle distance.

== Description ==
The sitter wears the livery collar of Order of the Golden Fleece, a chivalric order established on January 10, 1430, by Philip the Good, Duke of Burgundy. In 1456 Anthony was inducted into the prestigious Order, held by only 29 others at that time. The exact significance of the arrow held in the bastard's hand is unknown, although the fleece is thought to refer to either the Greek mythological hero Jason or the Hebrew warrior and judge Gideon.

In his later commissioned portraits, van der Weyden typically flattered his sitters. He often idealised or softened their facial features, allowing them a handsomeness or beauty, interest or intelligence they might not have had in life. If this portrait is compared to the unromantic portrait of Antoine attributed to Hans Memling, painted 8–10 years later, one can see the liberties taken by van der Weyden. Even allowing for aging, the artist seems to have enlarged the eyes, defined the contours of the face, and given a much stronger jaw than seen in Memling's portrait.

The physical dissimilarities from other portraits of Anthony of Burgundy have made some critics tentatively identify the sitter of this portrait as John of Coimbra, Prince of Antioch, knight of the Golden Fleece who was sent into exile in Burgundy after his father Infante Peter, Duke of Coimbra was killed in action in the Battle of Alfarrobeira when an arrow pierced his heart (thus providing a plausible explanation for the meaning of the arrow held by the sitter).

== See also ==
- List of works by Rogier van der Weyden

== Sources ==
- Allmand, Christopher. The New Cambridge Medieval History: Volume 7, c.1415-c.1500: C.1415-c.1500 v. 7. Cambridge University Press, 1998. ISBN 0-521-38296-3
- Campbell, Lorne. Van der Weyden. London: Chaucer Press, 2004. ISBN 1-904449-24-7
