= Portrait of Isabella of Portugal (van der Weyden) =

15th-century oil painting

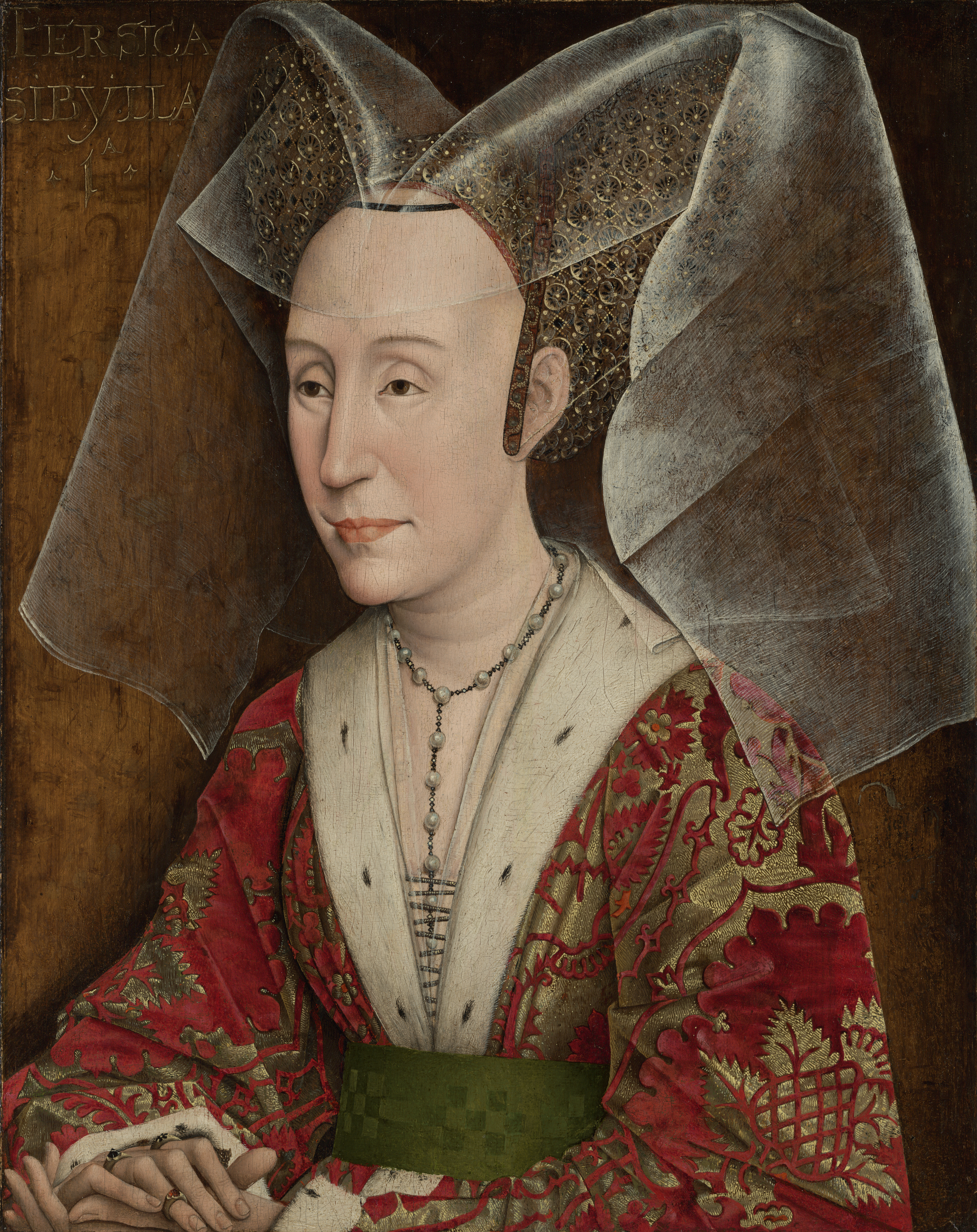
Portrait of Isabella of Portugal, Rogier van der Weyden or workshop member c. 1450. 46 x 37.1 cm (18 1/8 x 14 5/8 in.) Getty Center.

The Portrait of Isabella of Portugal is a 15th-century oil-on-oak painting of Isabella of Portugal, Duchess of Burgundy, the third wife of Philip the Good. The portrait was probably completed by a member of Rogier van der Weyden's workshop, although it was earlier attributed to him. It dates to around 1450.

== Description ==
Isabella's expression is slightly mocking. She is dressed in an ornately decorated red and gold brocade dress, tightly pulled below at her waist by a green sash, although the artist did not match the brocade pattern on the sleeves. The high butterfly hennin and the rings on her fingers denote nobility. The duchess's fingers are elongated, typical of van der Weyden's style, yet this is believed to be a copy of an original van der Weyden portrait which is now lost.

On the upper right is the inscription PERSICA SIBYLLA IA, which suggests it may have been one of a series of portraits depicting sibyls, an identity which contrasts with Isabella's. The inscription and brown faux wood background are later additions.

== Provenance ==
It is not known who owned the painting before 1629. It may have belonged to Alexandre d'Arenberg, Duke of Croy and Prince of Chimay, from the end about 1590 to 1629. It was bought by a dealer in 1883 and later sold to Adolph Carl de Rothschild a few years later; when he died in 1900, his son, Baron Maurice de Rothschild inherited the painting, and sold it to John D. Rockefeller in 1927. It stayed in the Rockefeller family until the Getty Center bought it in 1978.
