= John G. Johnson =

American lawyer

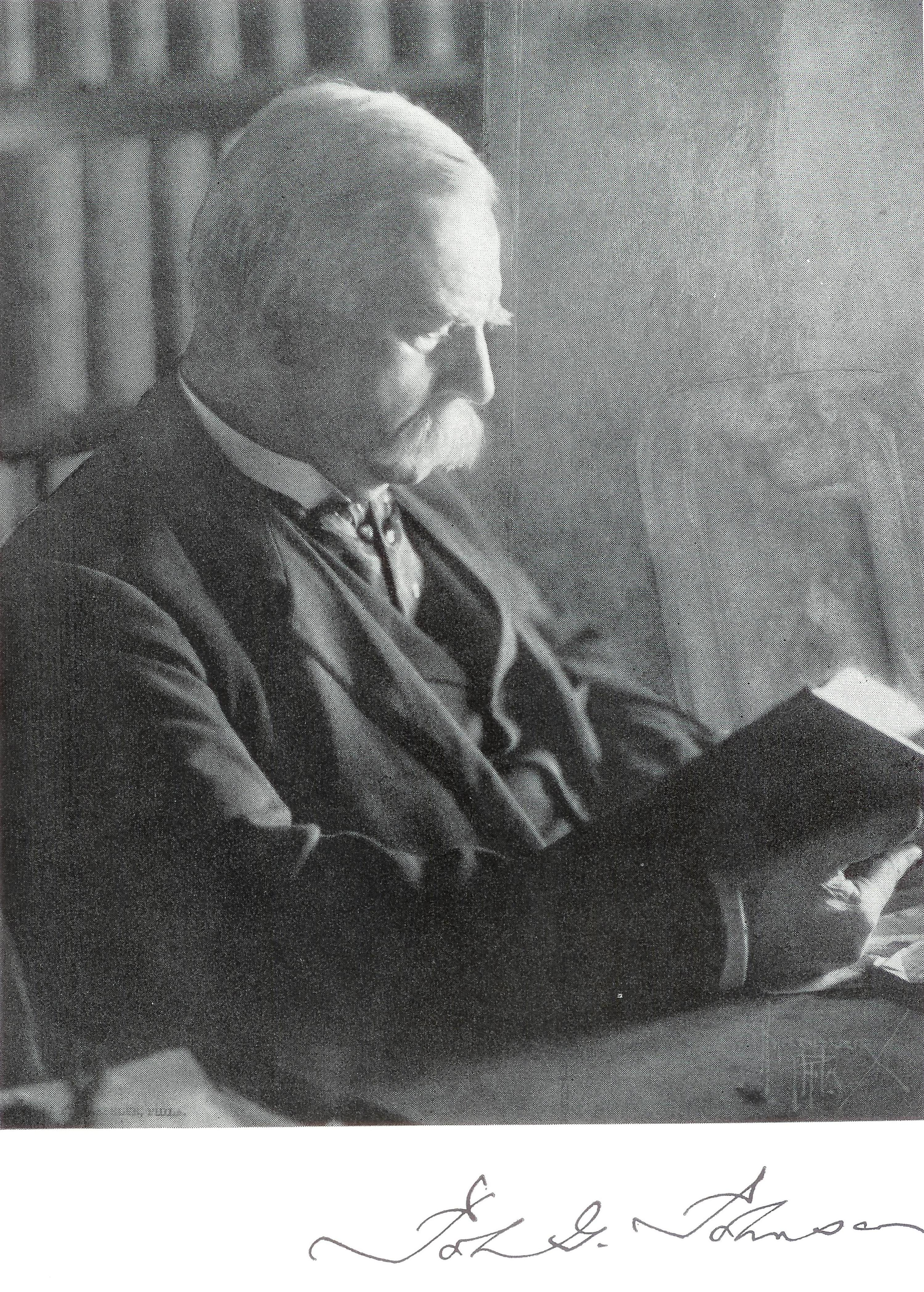
John G. Johnson, c. 1913

John Graver Johnson (1841, Philadelphia, Pennsylvania – April 13, 1917, Philadelphia, Pennsylvania) was an American corporate lawyer and art collector. The Philadelphia law firm that he founded in 1863 continues under the name Saul Ewing. His collection of nearly 1,300 paintings forms the core of early European works at the Philadelphia Museum of Art.

== Career ==
The son of a blacksmith, he attended Philadelphia public schools, and apprenticed in the law offices of Benjamin & Murray Rush. He was admitted to the Philadelphia Bar in February 1863, and served briefly in the American Civil War. He had an extraordinary memory, reportedly memorizing Shakespeare plays as a youth, and reciting extended citations of law in the courtroom.

He argued 168 cases before the United States Supreme Court, beginning in 1884. He represented the Standard Oil Company, the Sugar Trust, the American Tobacco Company, and the Northern Securities Company; and was counsel for J. P. Morgan & Company, the Pennsylvania Railroad, the New York Central Railroad, the Baldwin Locomotive Company, the United States Steel Corporation, the Amalgamated Copper Company, the American Distilleries Company, and many other corporations and banks.

Johnson declined offers to be nominated to the United States Supreme Court from Presidents James Garfield and Grover Cleveland. President William McKinley unsuccessfully sought him to become U.S. Attorney General.

In an April 15, 1917 obituary, The New York Times called him, "the greatest lawyer in the English-speaking world," and, "probably less known to the general public in proportion to his importance than any other man in the United States."

== Art collecting ==
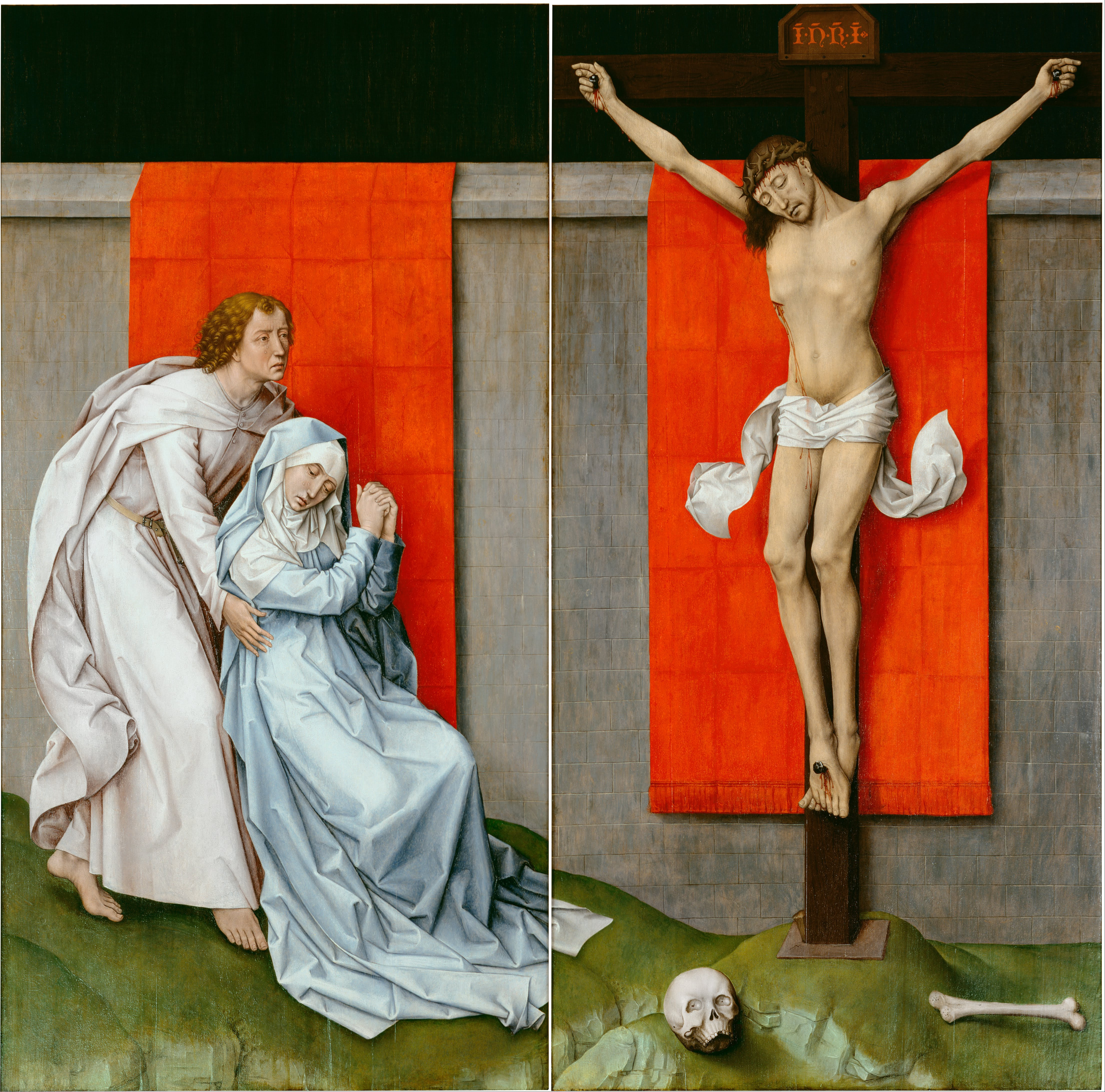
Crucifixion Diptych (c. 1460), Rogier van der Weyden. The Philadelphia Museum of Art describes this as the "greatest Old Master painting in the Museum."

Johnson amassed one of the finest art collections in the United States. Relying on his own judgment and study, he concentrated on early-Renaissance Italian primitives, Spanish, Flemish, and Dutch paintings. He also bought works by artists who were his contemporaries, including Eduard Charlemont, Gustave Courbet, Mariano Fortuny, T. Alexander Harrison, Édouard Manet, Claude Monet, John Singer Sargent, and James Whistler. He made annual trips to Europe, and wrote a short memoir: Sight-Seeing in Berlin and Holland among Pictures (1892).

An assessment of the collection from 1914:

Undoubtably the rarest works and those upon which an orthodox collection rests most securely for its prestige are to be found among the Italian paintings. There are Pesellino's Virgin and Child Between Two Saints, an early Corregio, a portrait by Botticelli of extreme historical as well as aesthetic interest, and a beautiful predella by that master recounting the legend of Mary Magdalen, a magnificently dramatic Pietà by Crivelli, and a decorative pair of panels by Cima da Conegliano, Carpaccio's tender Story of Alcione, a Virgin and Child by Giovanni Bellini, a Magdalen Reading by Luca Signorelli, authentic specimens of Basaiti and Catena, and other paintings that in more than one instance represent masters to be found in but few of the great European galleries.

From these wide-eyed Italian Primitives one turns, however, with a quickened spirit to the Flemish and Dutch pictures, of which the collection possesses remarkable examples. Among these Pieter Breughel's two characteristic compositions, and a noble array of pictures by Jan Steen, more than any other American collection possesses, claim particular attention.

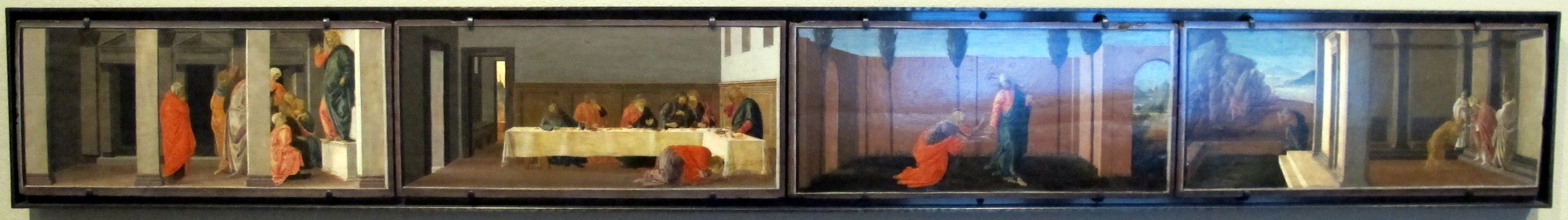
Legend of the Magdalen Predella (c. 1425), Sandro Botticelli.

== Family ==
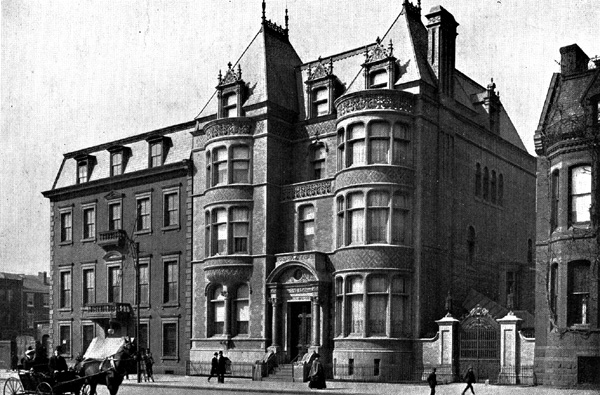
John G. Johnson Collection Museum (center), 510 South Broad Street, Philadelphia, PA. Part of Johnson's residence is visible at far right.

In 1875, he married Ida Powel Morrell, a widow with three small children. They had no children together. The family lived at 506 South Broad Street, and he later bought the adjacent house to store his art collection.

== Bequest ==
In his Will, Johnson left the collection to the City of Philadelphia with the provision that it be exhibited at 510 South Broad Street. A proposal to build a museum on the new Benjamin Franklin Parkway to house the collection was considered and abandoned. Following six years in storage, the City opened the house museum in November 1923, but the first two floors provided only enough room to display 275 works. More than 1,000 works were stored on the upper floors or in rented space elsewhere. In 1931, the unexhibited works were moved into storage at the newly built Philadelphia Museum of Art. The City's fire marshal subsequently found 510 South Broad Street not to be fireproof, and in June 1933 the 275 exhibited works were "temporarily" transferred to the Philadelphia Museum of Art. The City demolished the Broad Street house in the late-1950s to build a medical clinic.

Johnson's art was exhibited as a separate collection within the Philadelphia Museum of Art for more than 50 years. In the 1980s legal approval was granted for the Museum to integrate the works into its full collection. The current 100-year loan of the collection lasts until 2083.

== Selected works from the Johnson Collection ==
=== Italian paintings ===
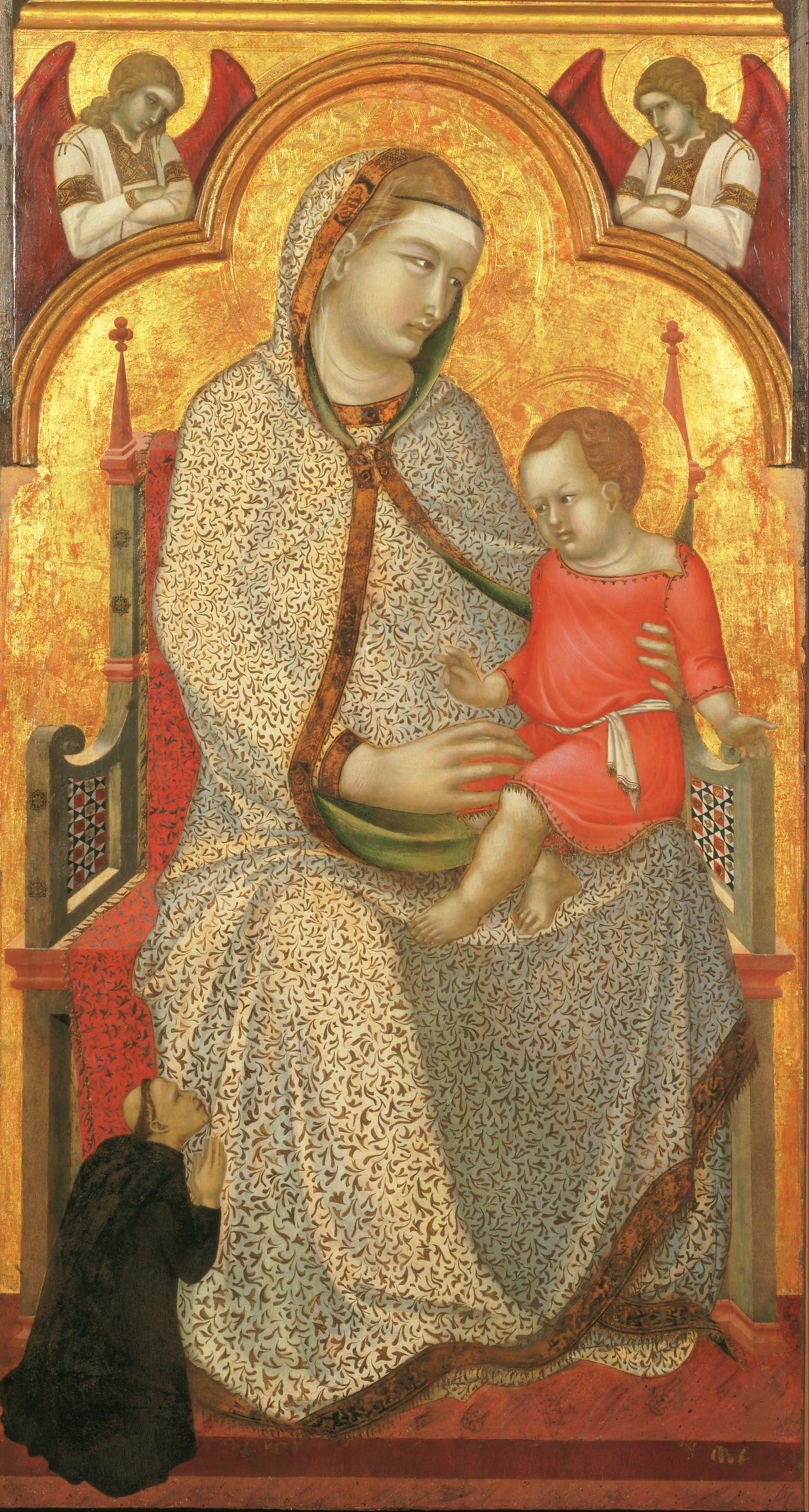
Madonna and Child Enthroned, with Donor and Angels (c. 1320), Pietro Lorenzetti.

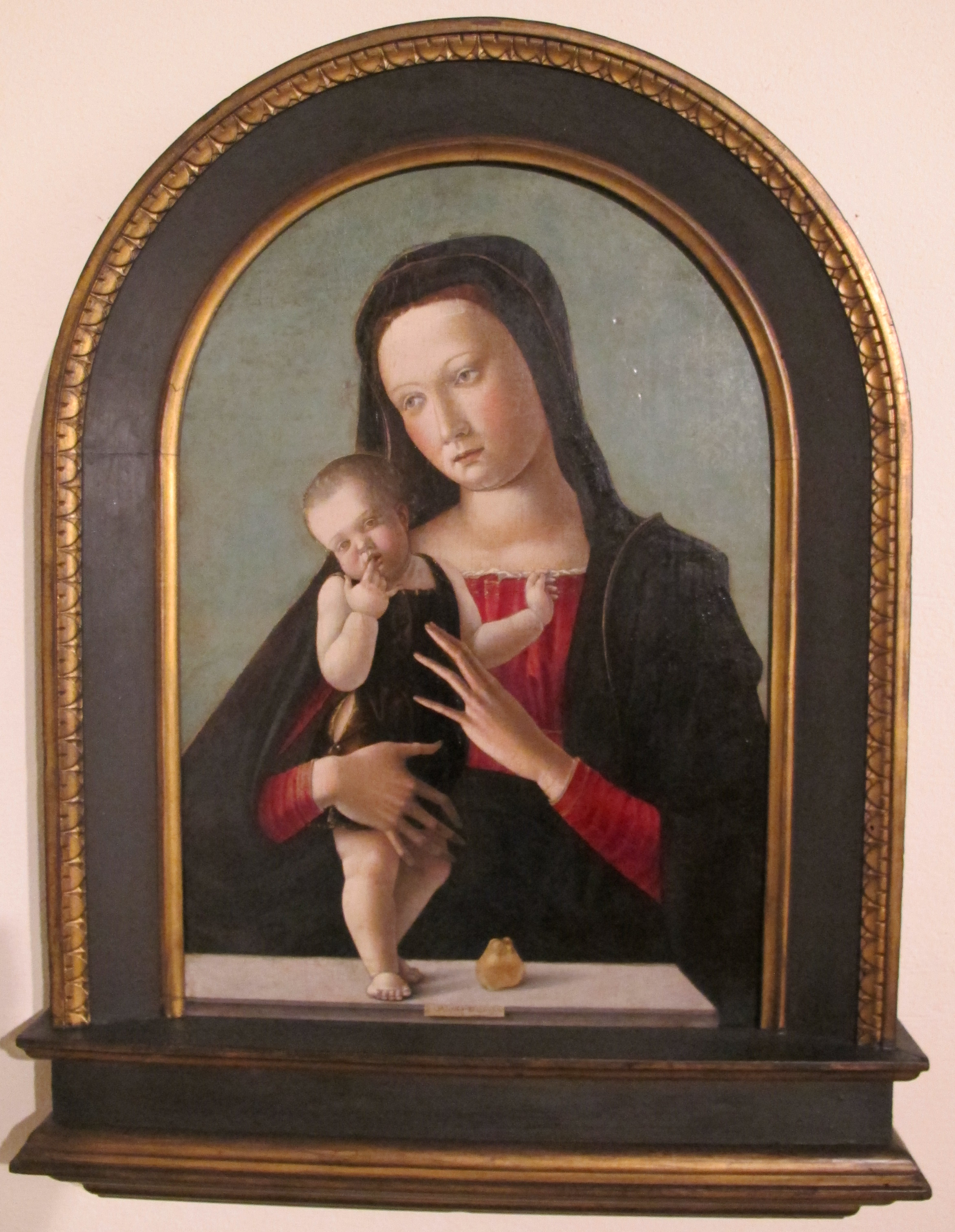
Madonna and Child (c. 1459-86), Giovanni Bellini.

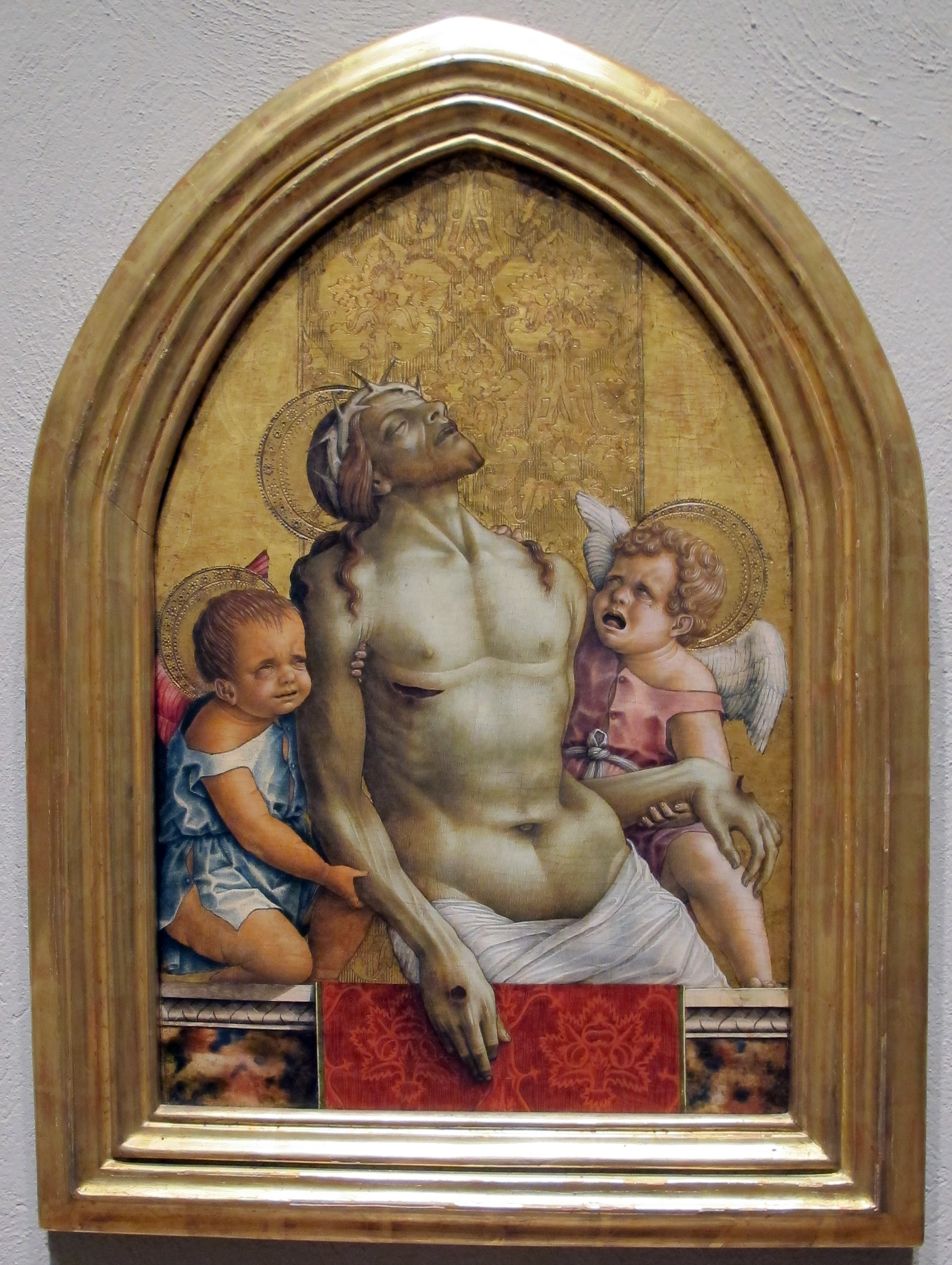
Pietà (Dead Christ Supported by Two Angels) (1472), Carlo Crivelli.

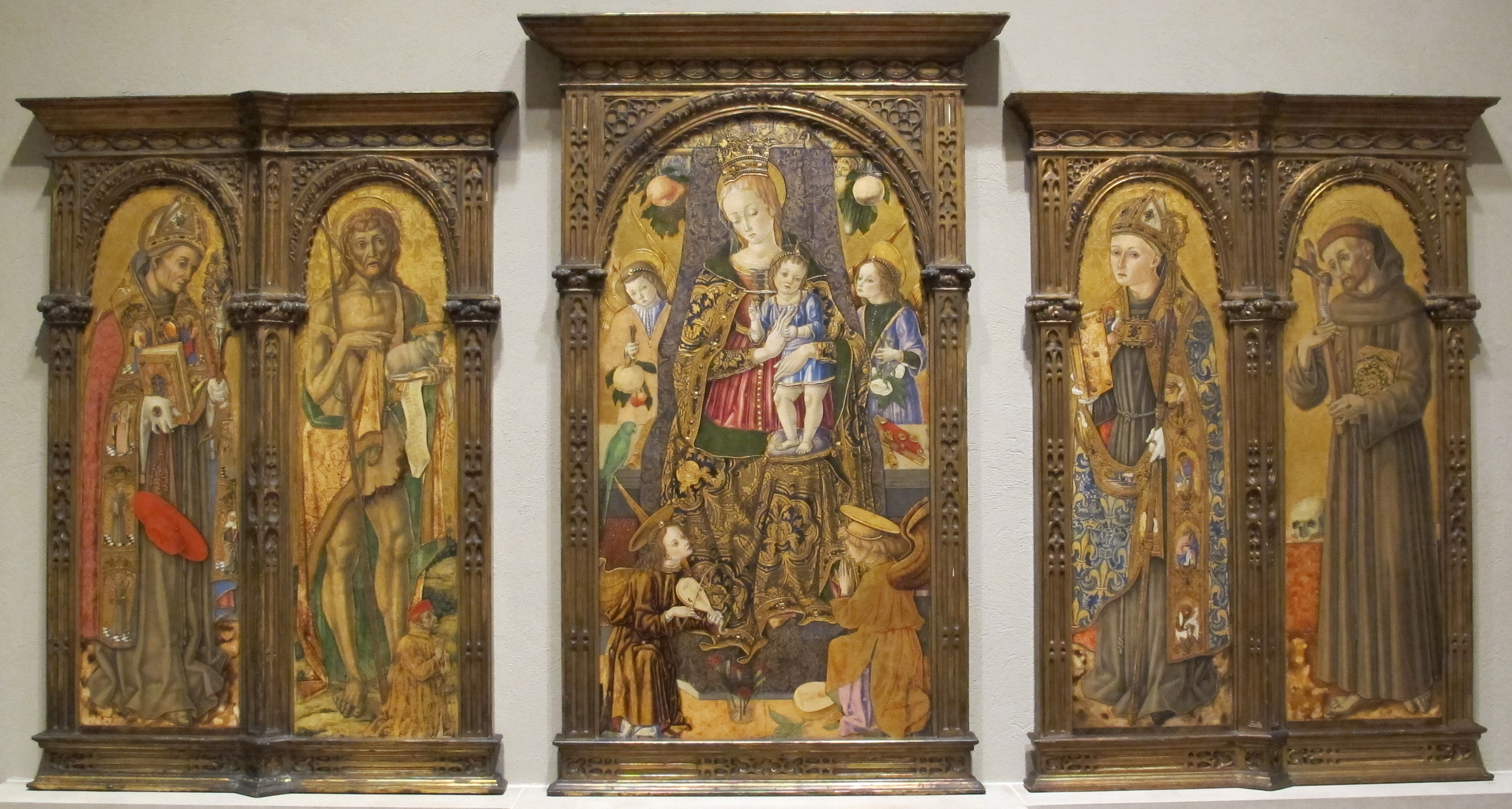
Madonna and Child with Saint Francis (1481), Vittore Crivelli.

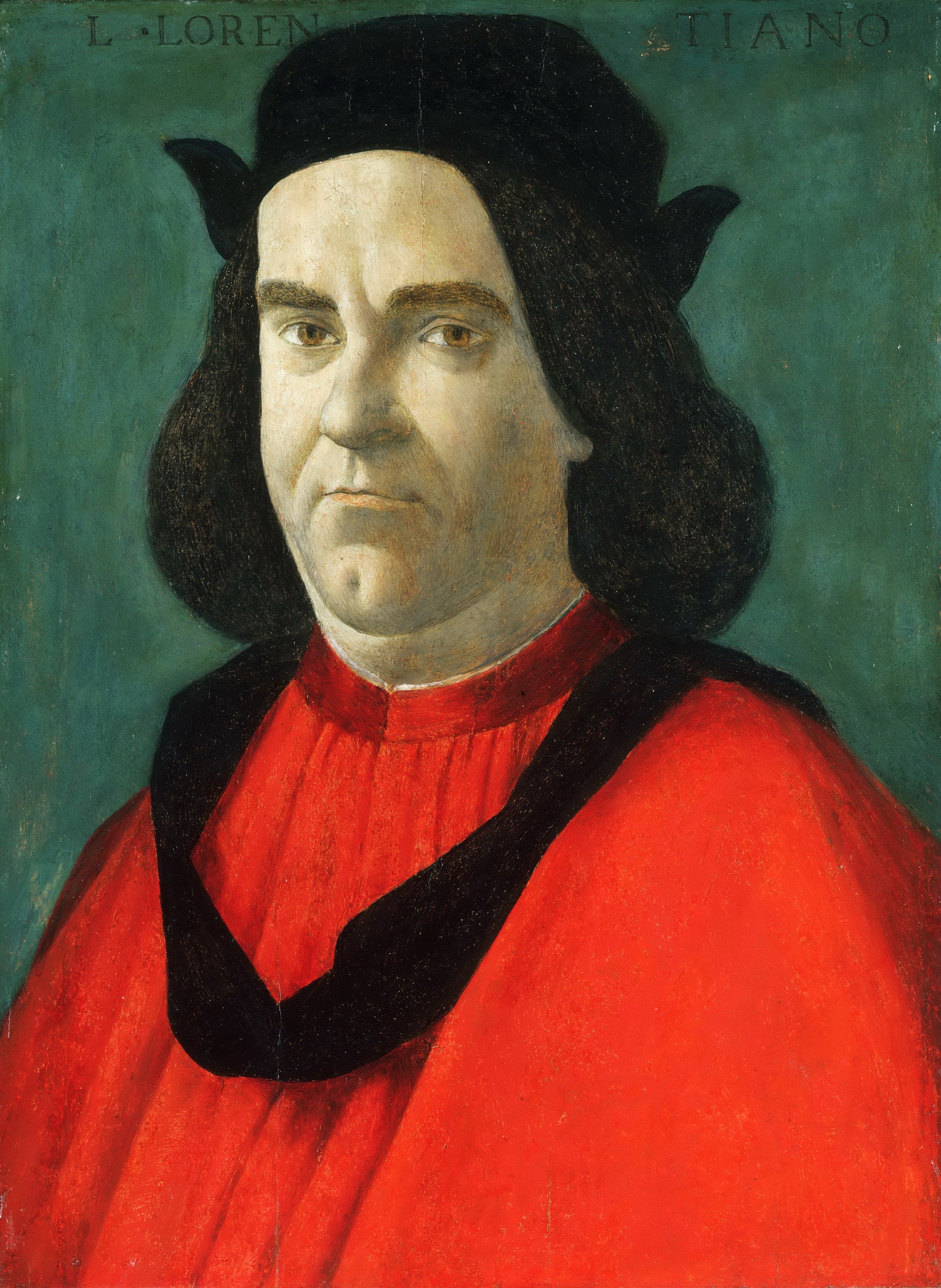
Portrait of Lorenzo de Lorenzi (1492), Sandro Botticelli.

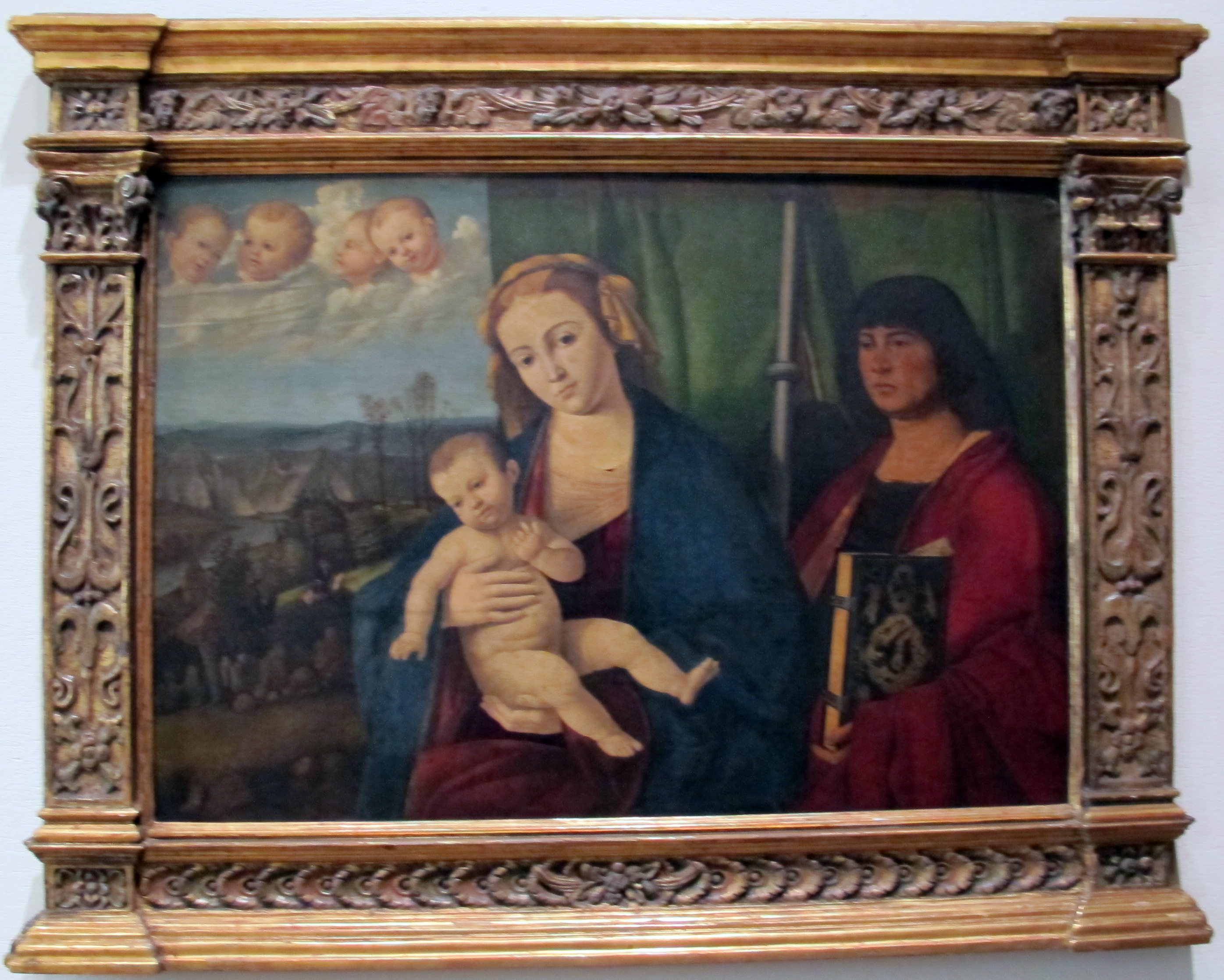
Madonna and Child (c. 1500-01), Marco Basaiti.

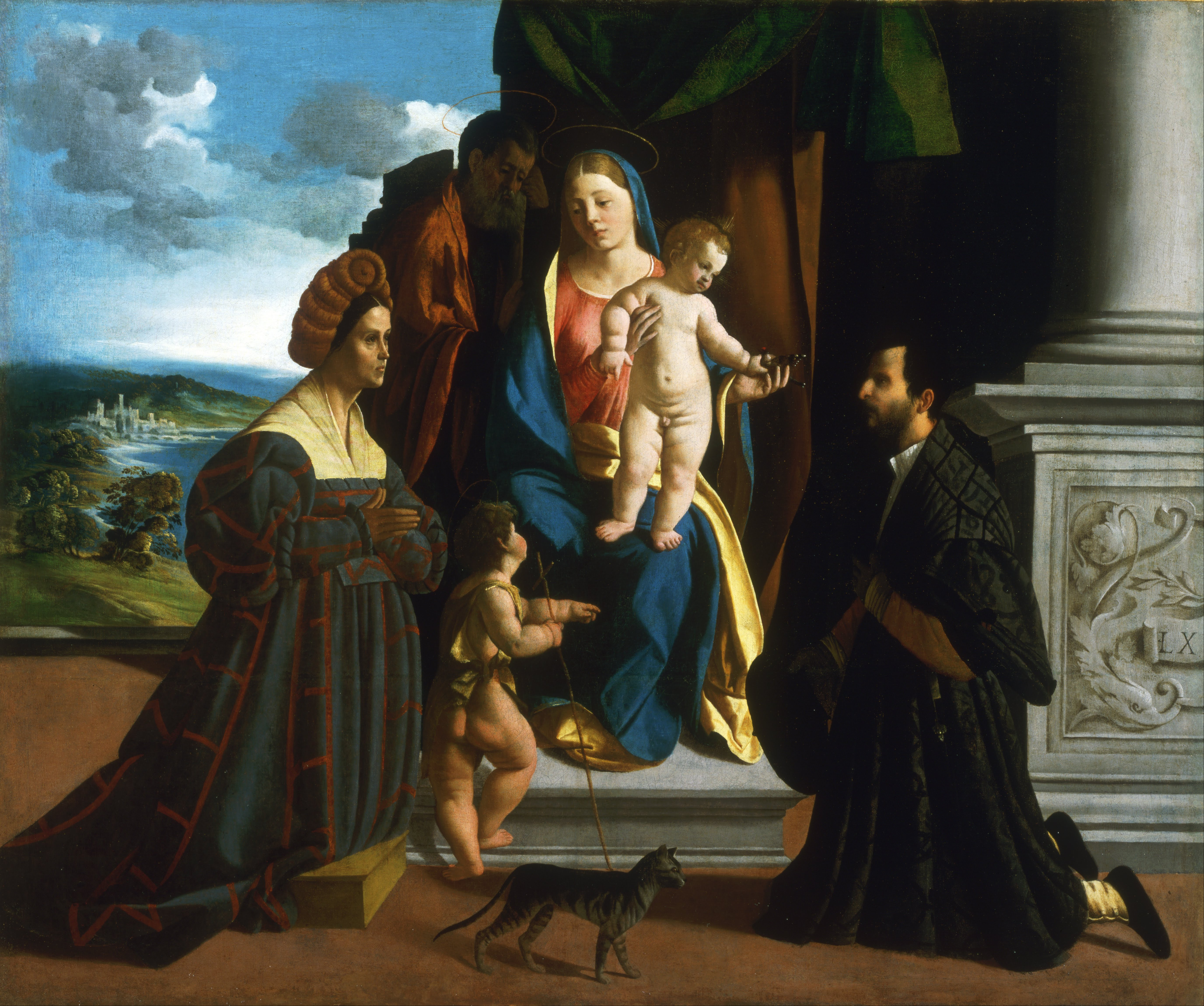
The Holy Family with John the Baptist, a Cat, and Two Donors (1512–13), Dosso Dossi.

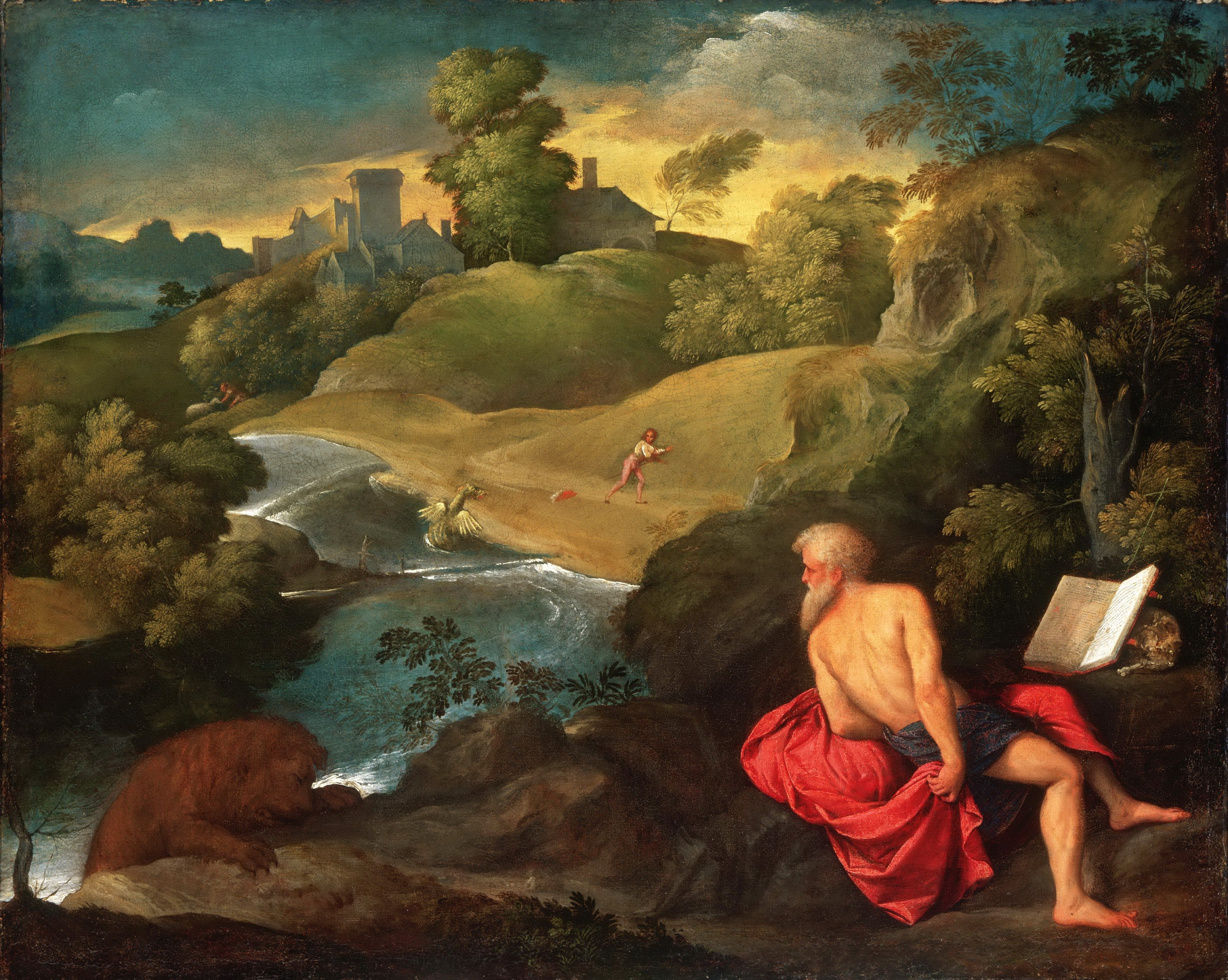
St. Jerome in the Wilderness (c. 1520-25), Paris Bordone.

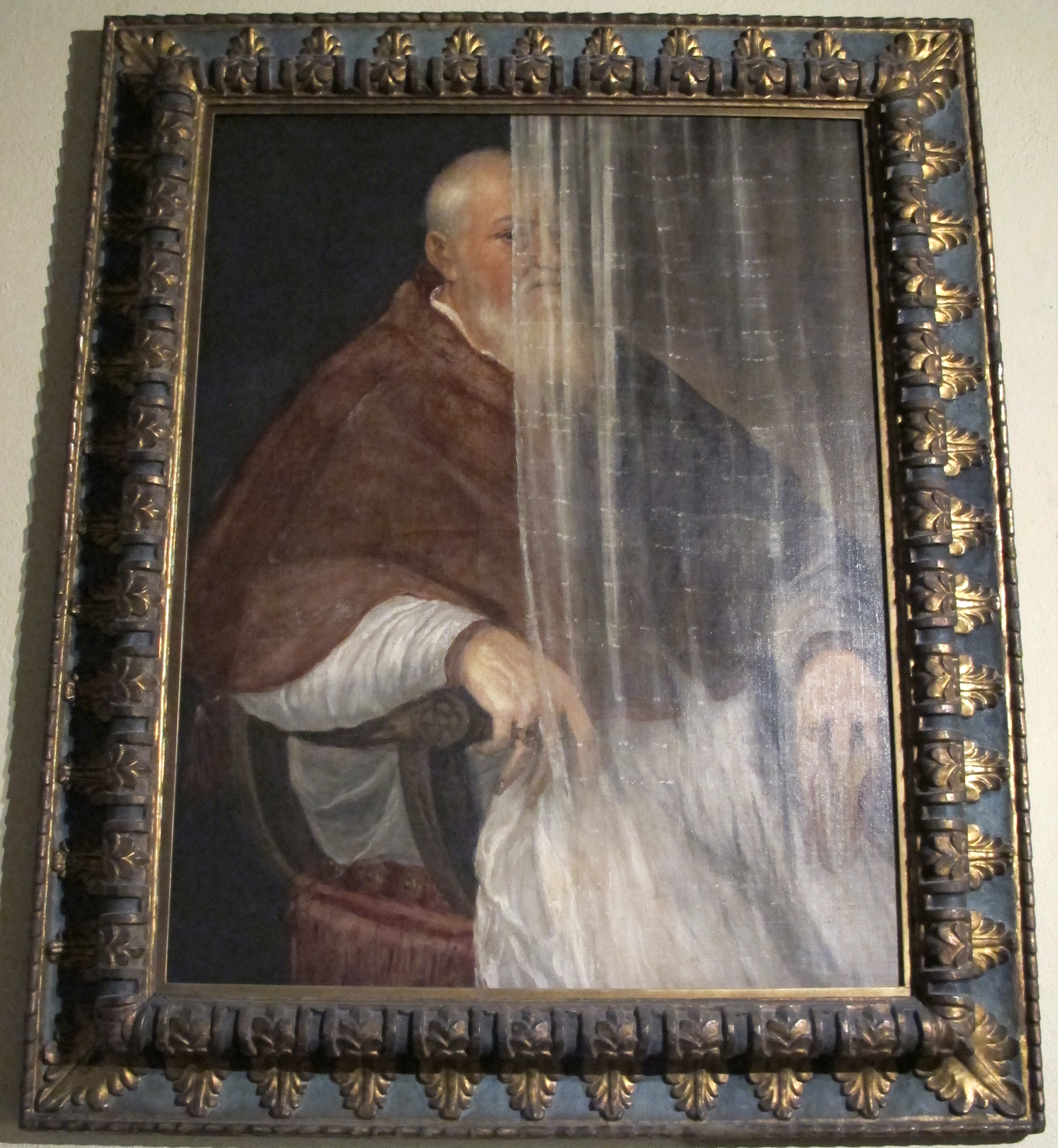
Cardinal Filippo Archinto (1558), Titian.

=== Flemish and Dutch paintings ===
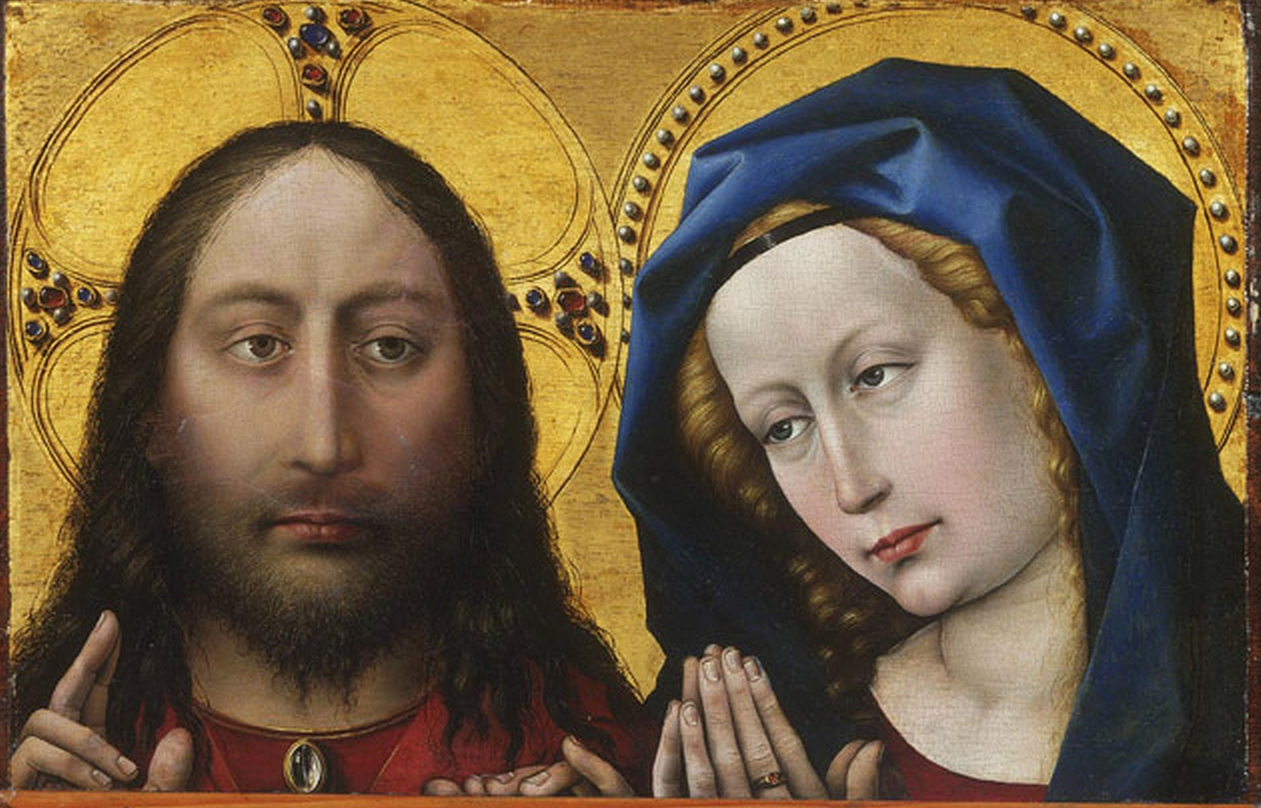
Blessing Christ and Praying Virgin (1424), Robert Campin.

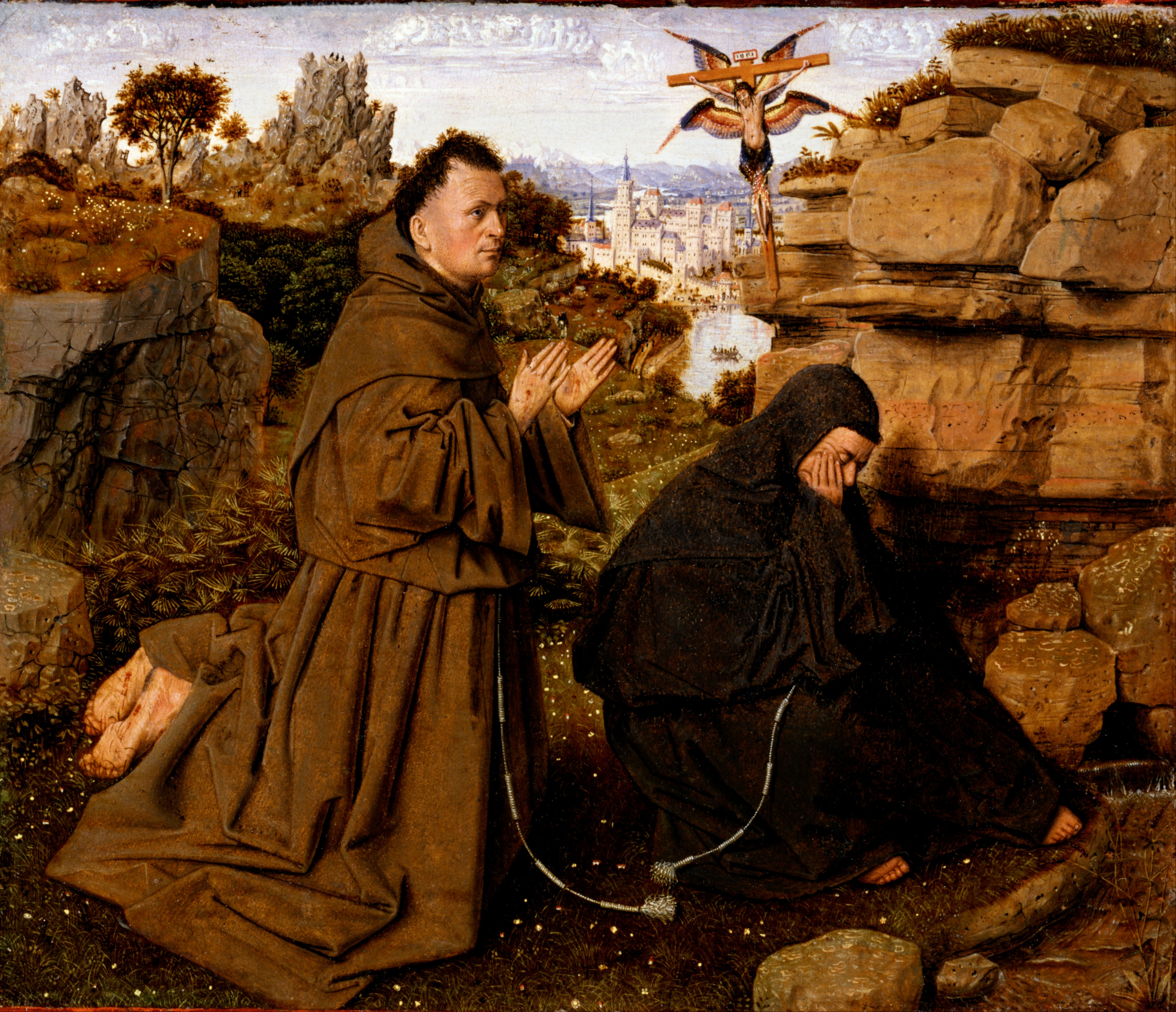
Saint Francis of Assisi Receiving the Stigmata (1430–32), attributed to Jan van Eyck. A copy is at the Sabauda Gallery in Turin, Italy.

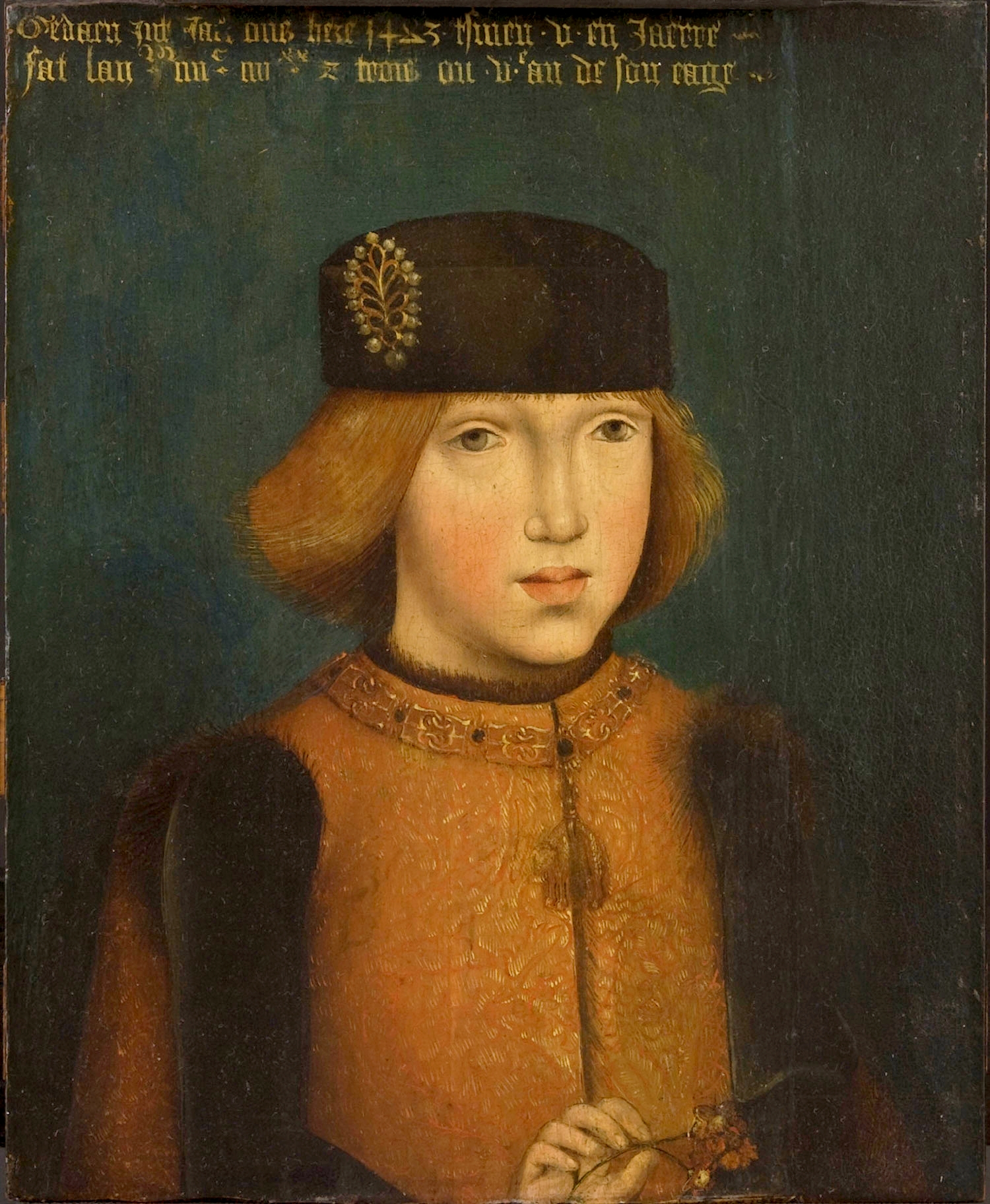
Philip the Handsome, at 5 Years (1483), Master of the Legend of the Magdalen.

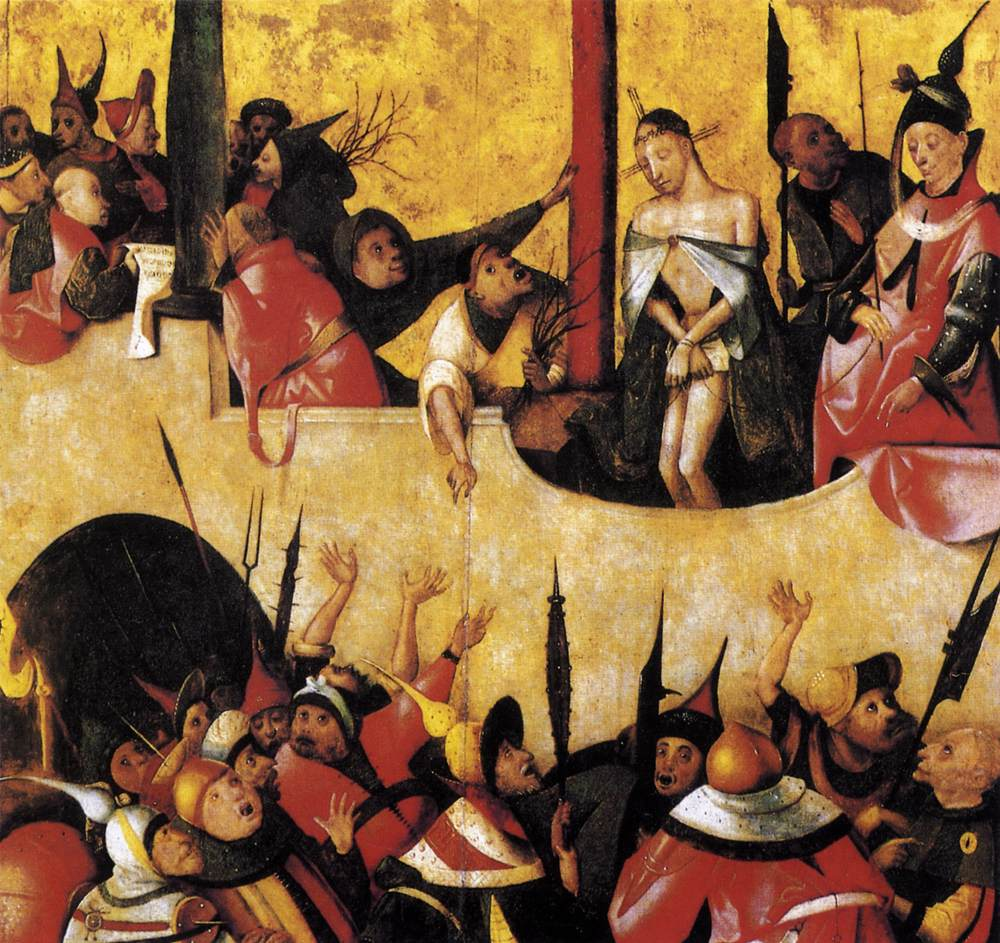
Ecce Homo (c.1510), attributed to Hieronymus Bosch. A related work is at the Indianapolis Museum of Art.

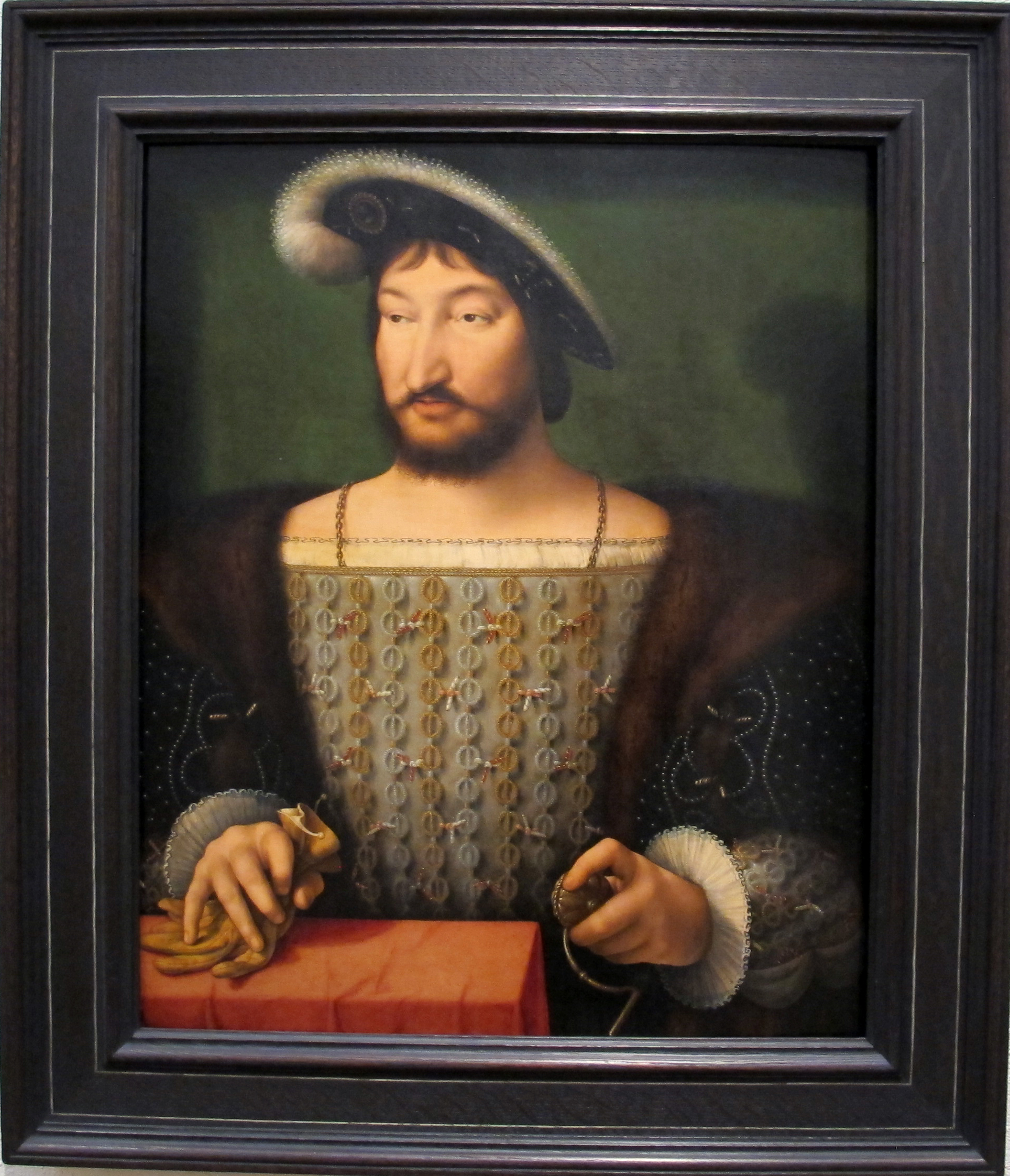
Francis I of France (c. 1530), Joos van Cleve.

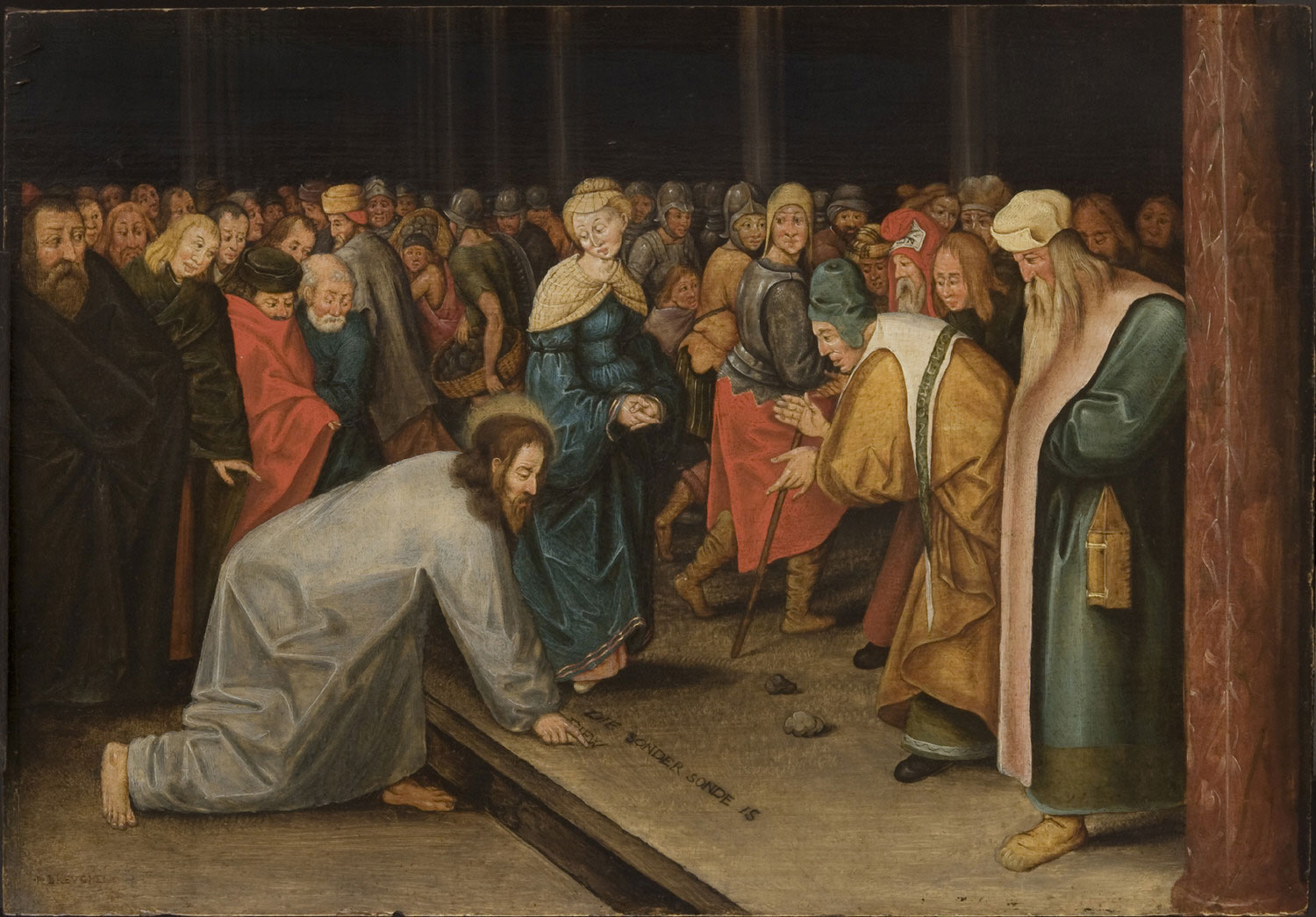
Christ and the Woman Taken in Adultery (c. 1600), Pieter Brueghel the Younger.

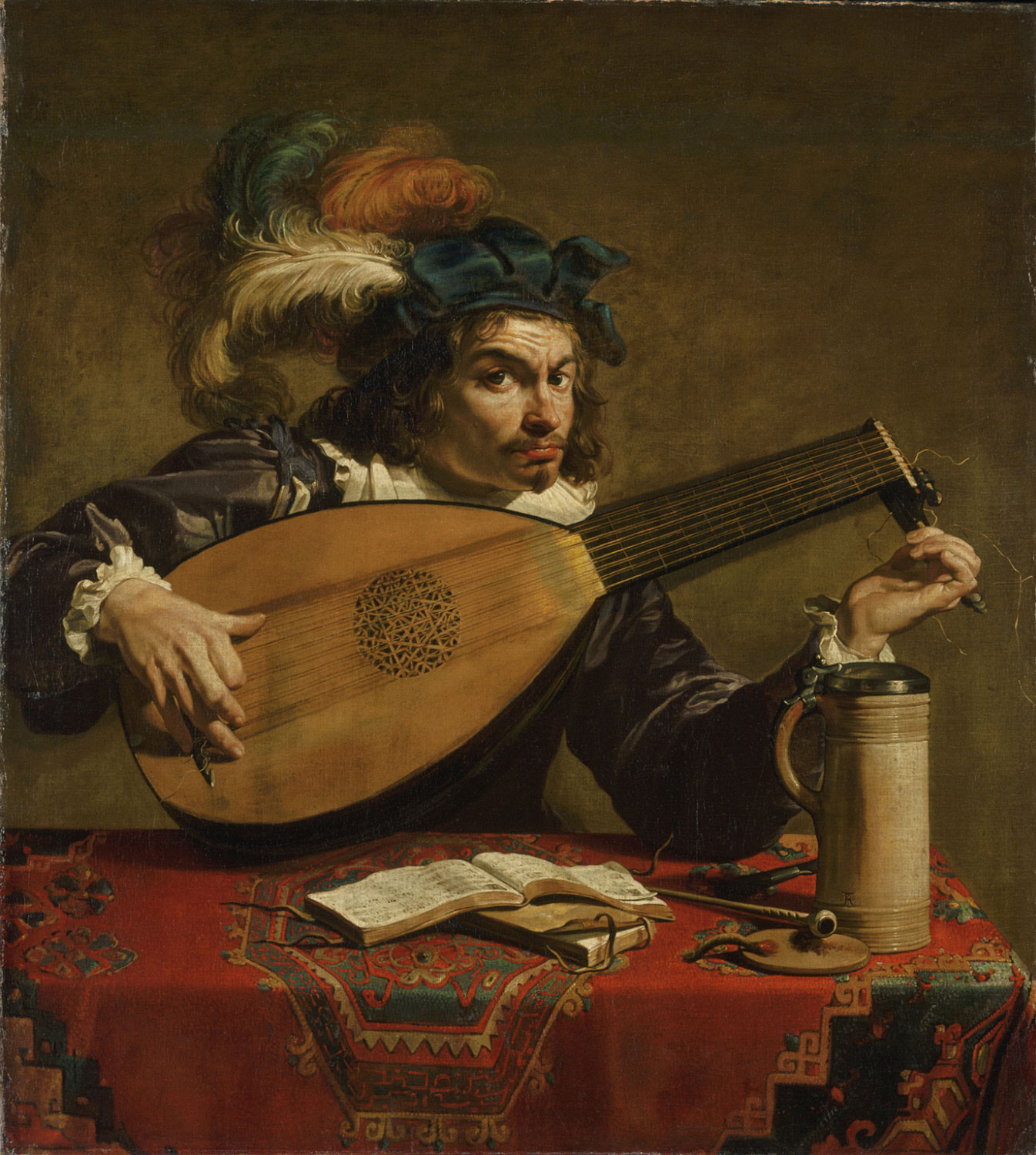
The Lute Player (c.1620), Theodoor Rombouts.

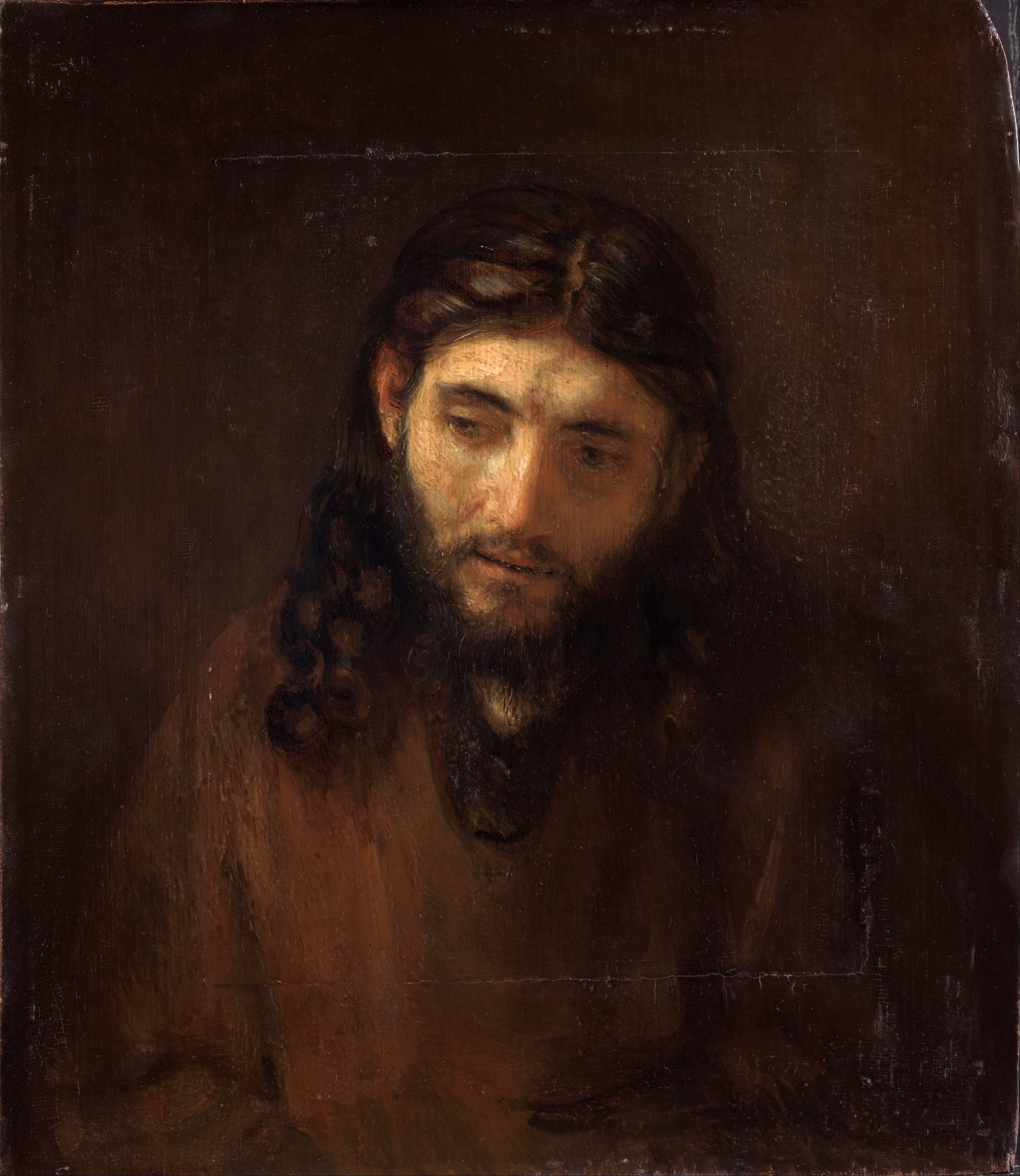
Head of Christ (c. 1648-56), Rembrandt van Rijn.

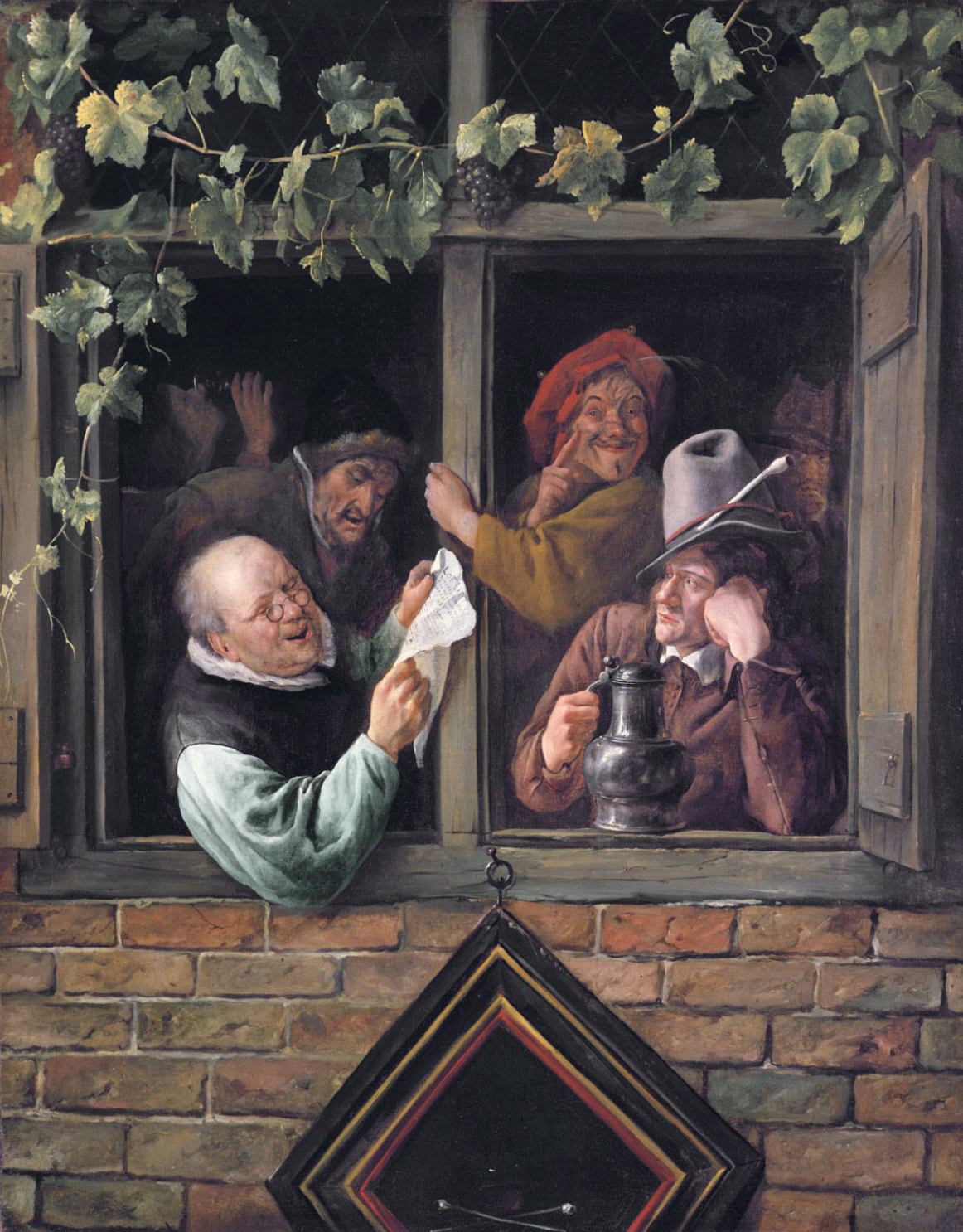
Rhetoricians at a Window (1662–68), Jan Steen.

=== Spanish and French paintings ===
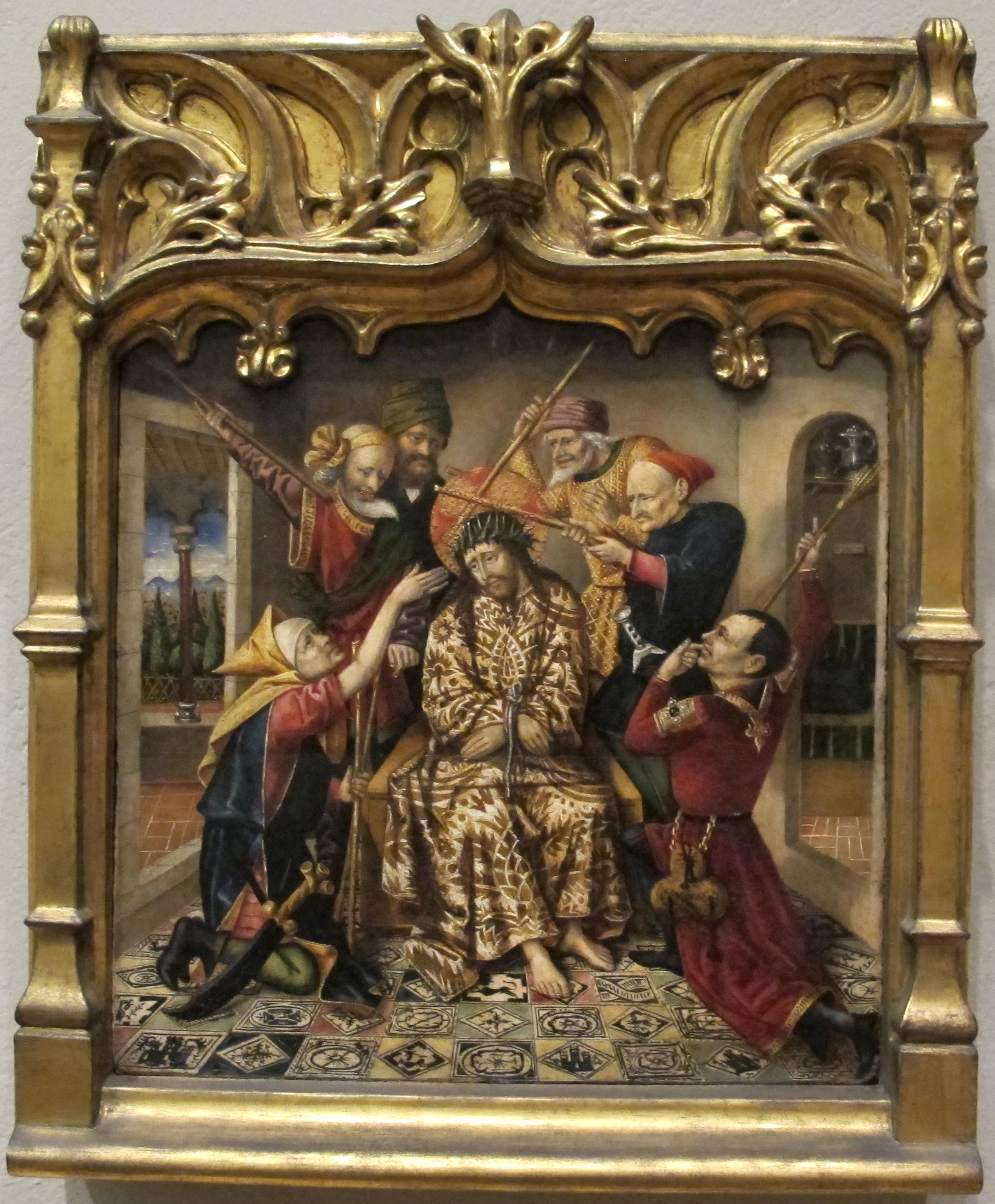
Christ Crowned with Thorns (c. 1476-80), Joan Reixach.

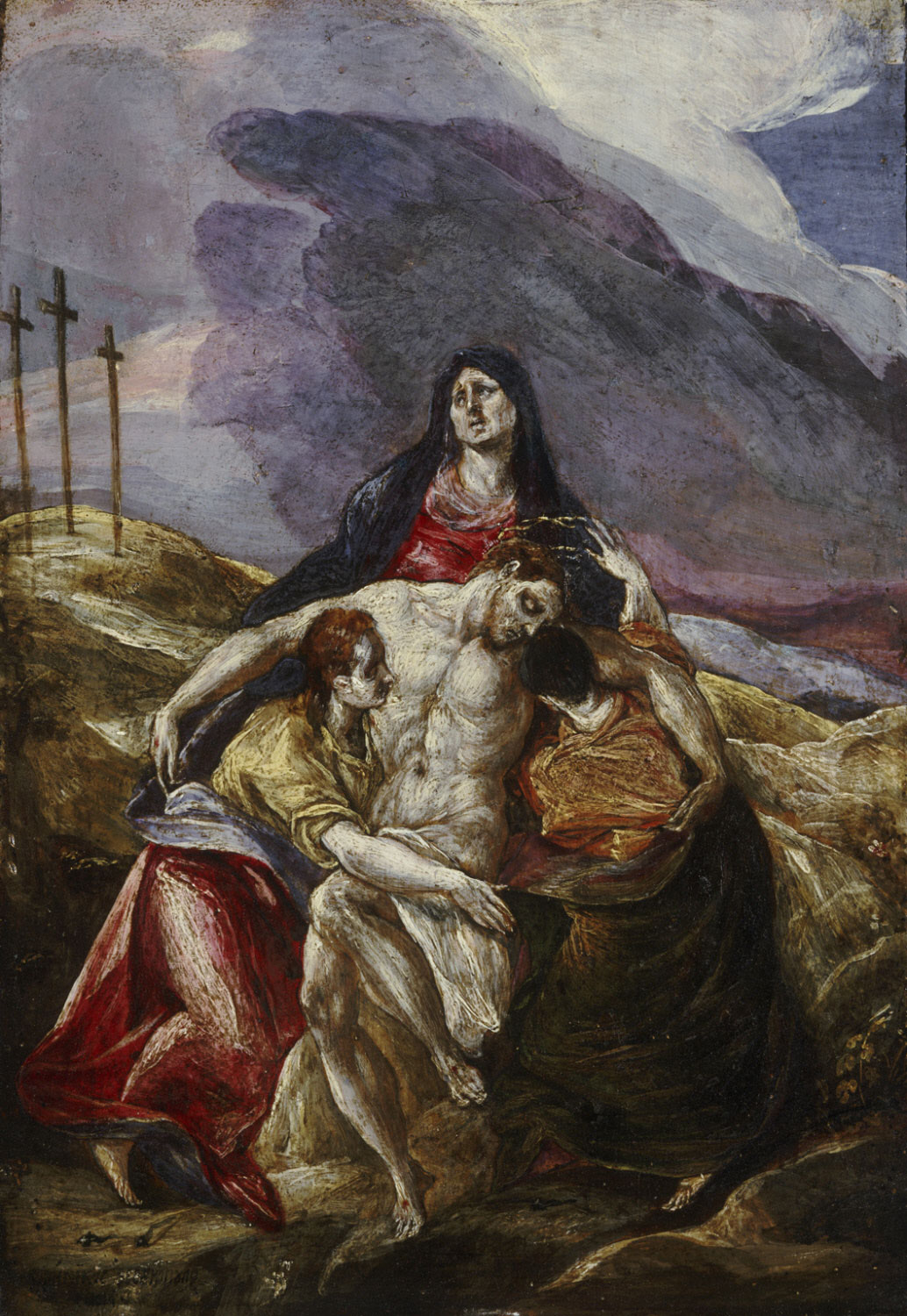
Pietà (1571–76), El Greco.

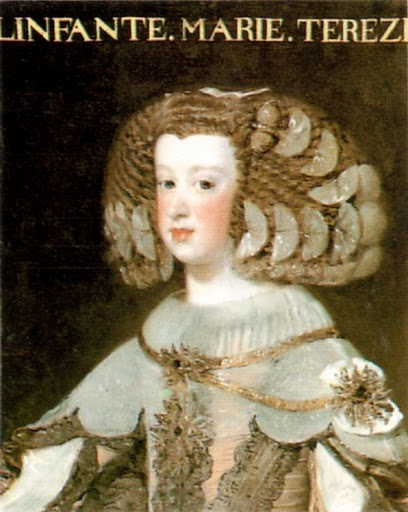
Infanta Maria Teresa (1650s), Studio of Diego Velázquez.

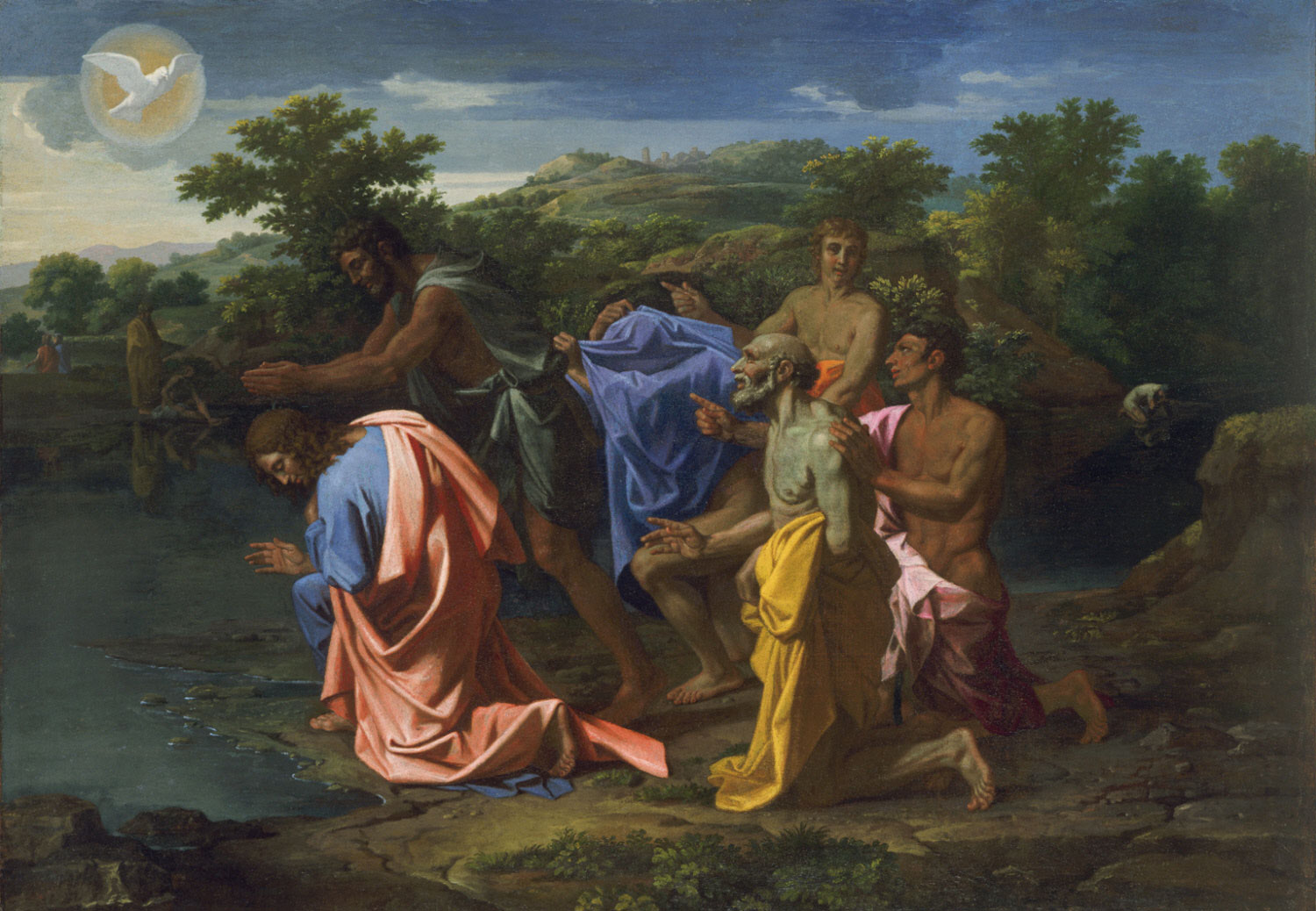
The Baptism of Christ (1655–57), Nicolas Poussin.

=== 19th century paintings ===
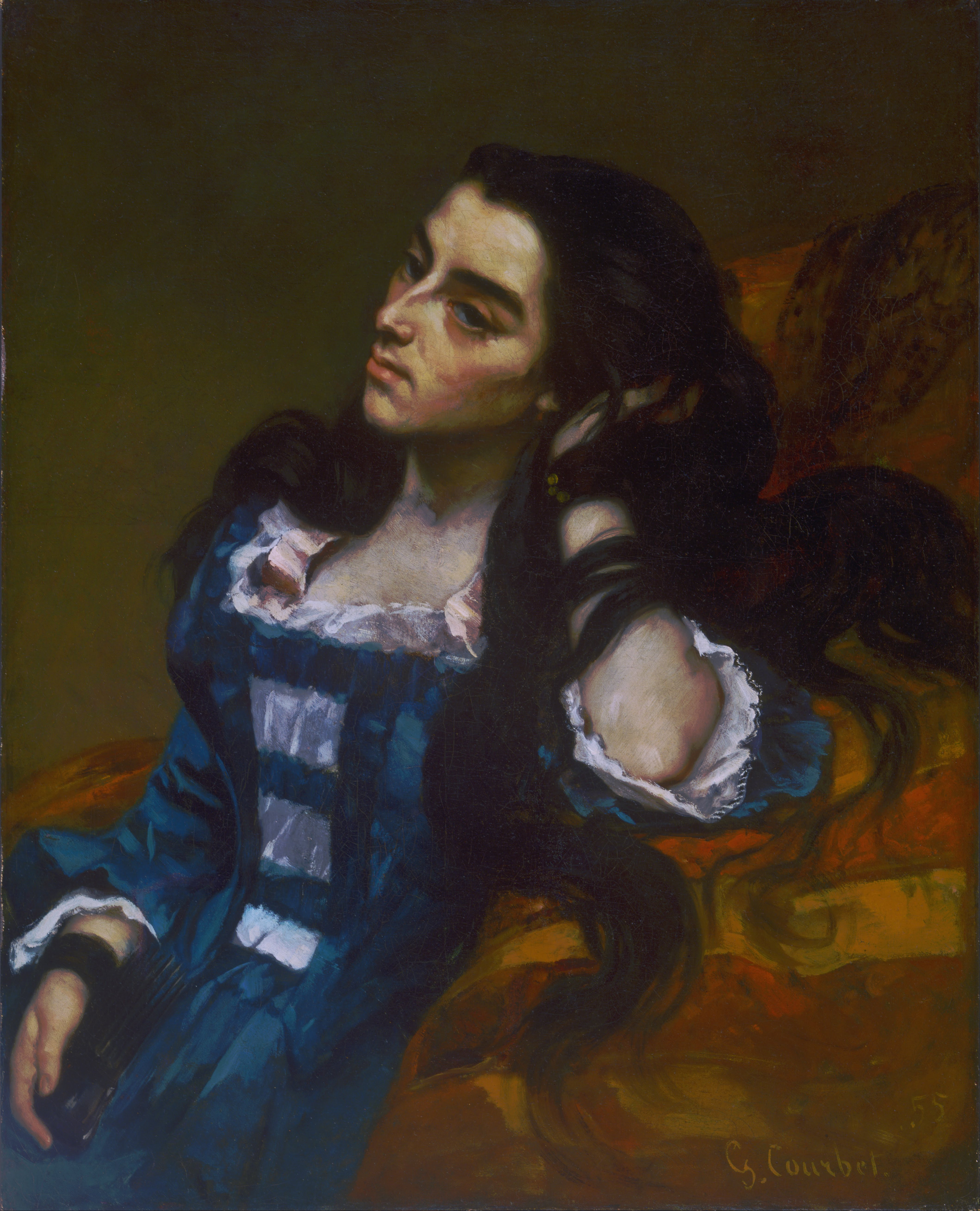
Spanish Woman (1855), Gustave Courbet.

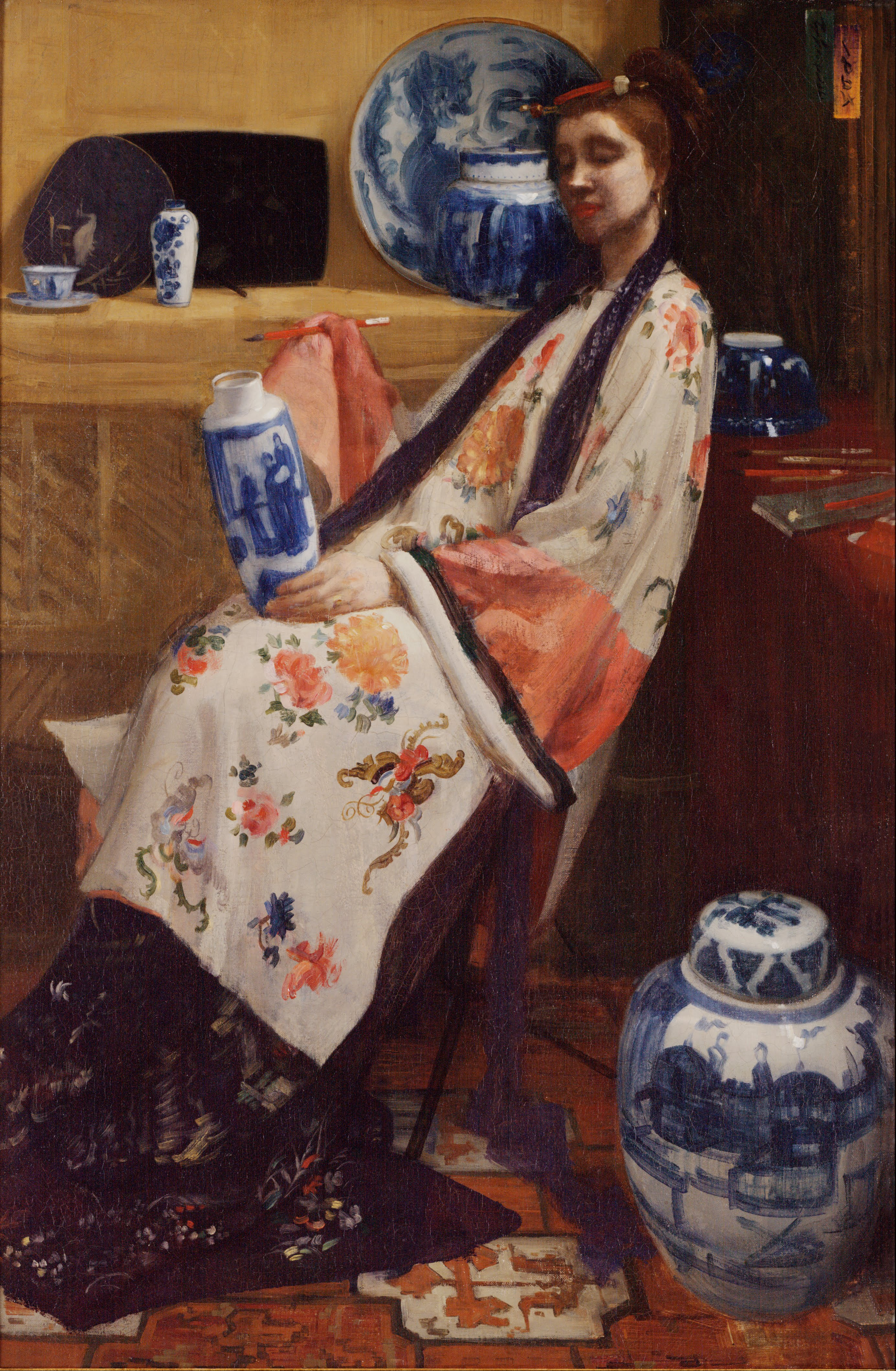
Purple and Rose- The Lange Leizen of the Six Marks (1864), James Abbott McNeill Whistler.

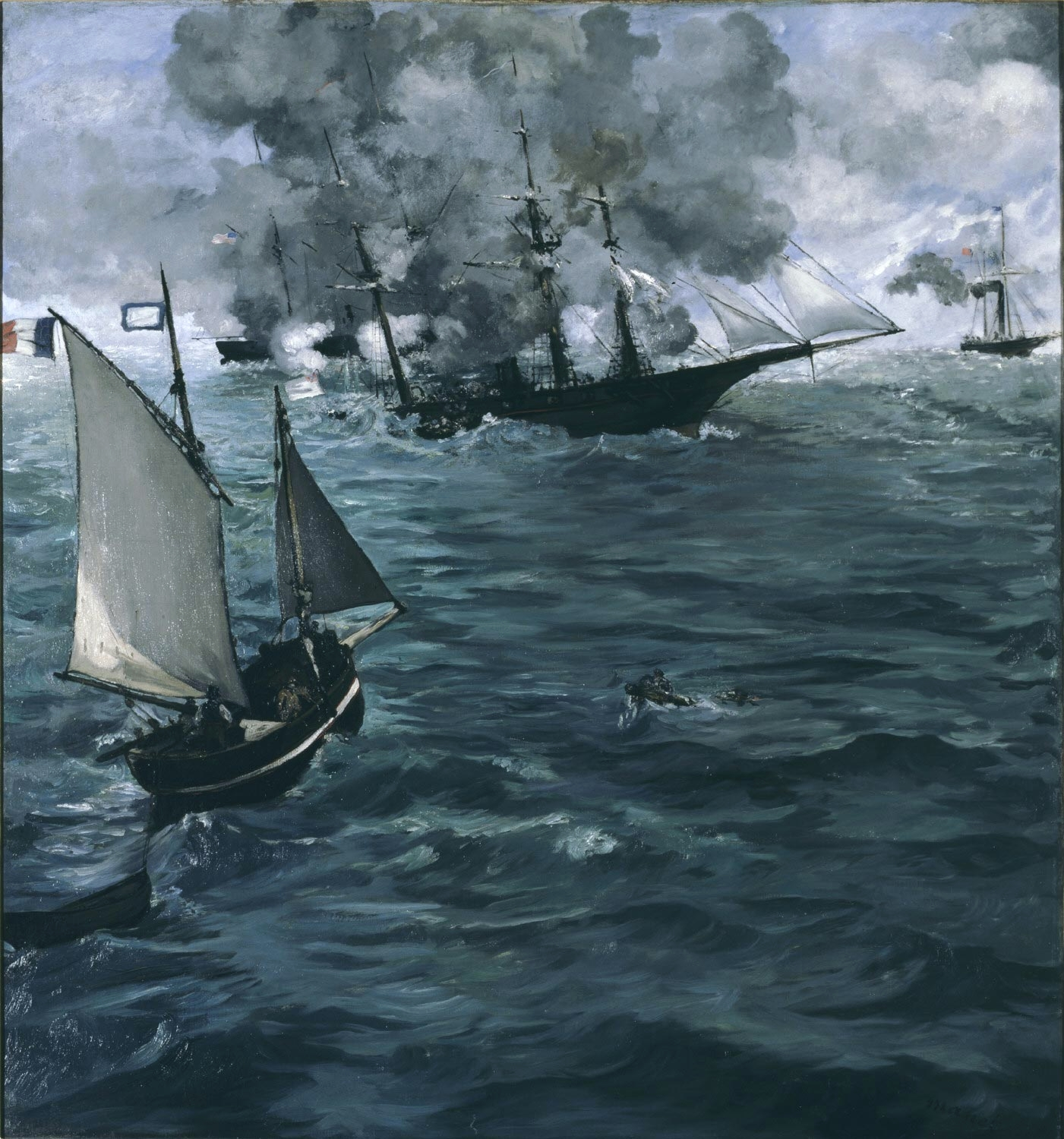
Battle of "The Kearsarge" and "The Alabama" (1864), Édouard Manet.

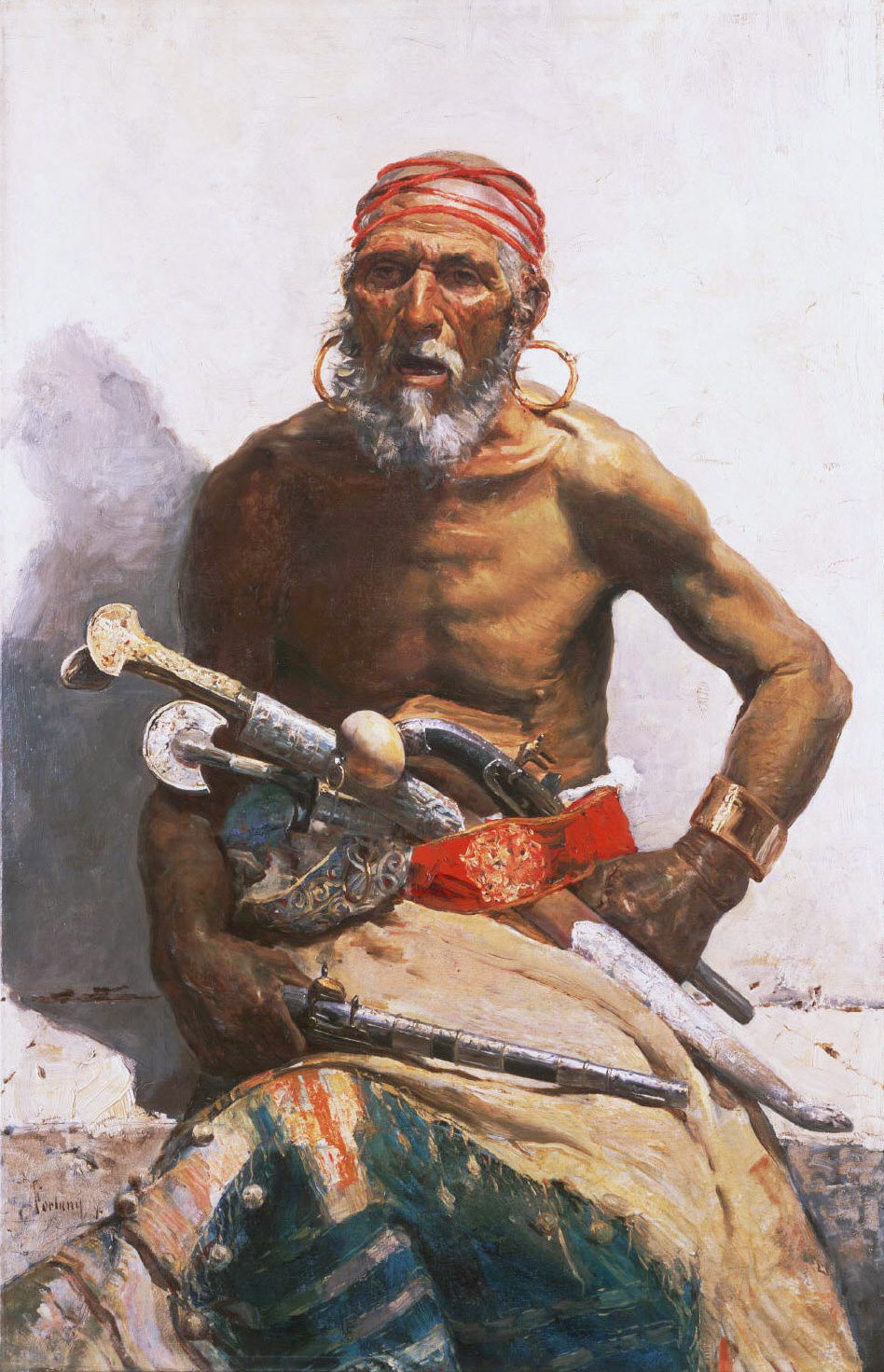
Arab Chief (1874), Mariano Fortuny.

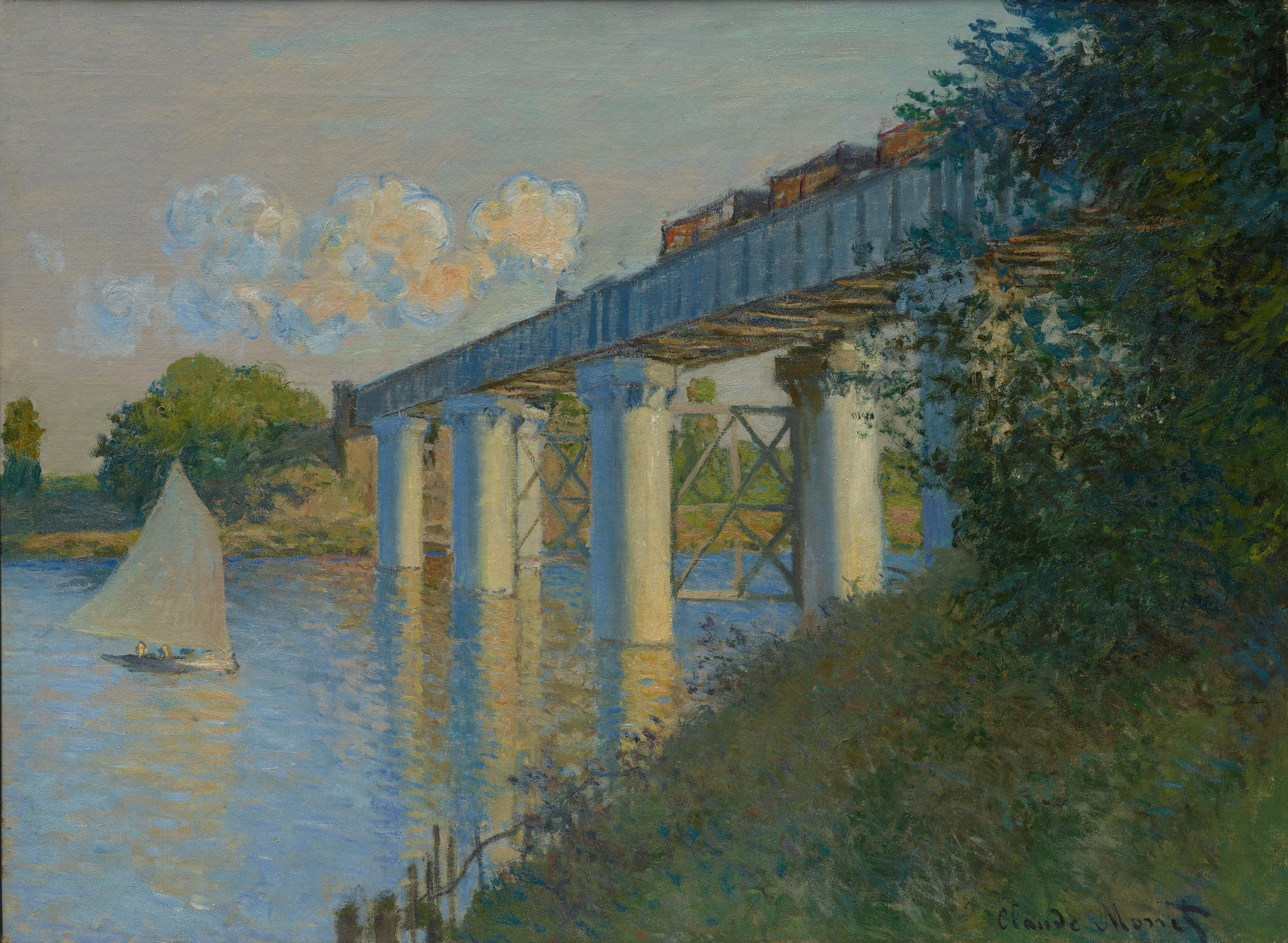
The Railway Bridge at Argenteuil (1874), Claude Monet.

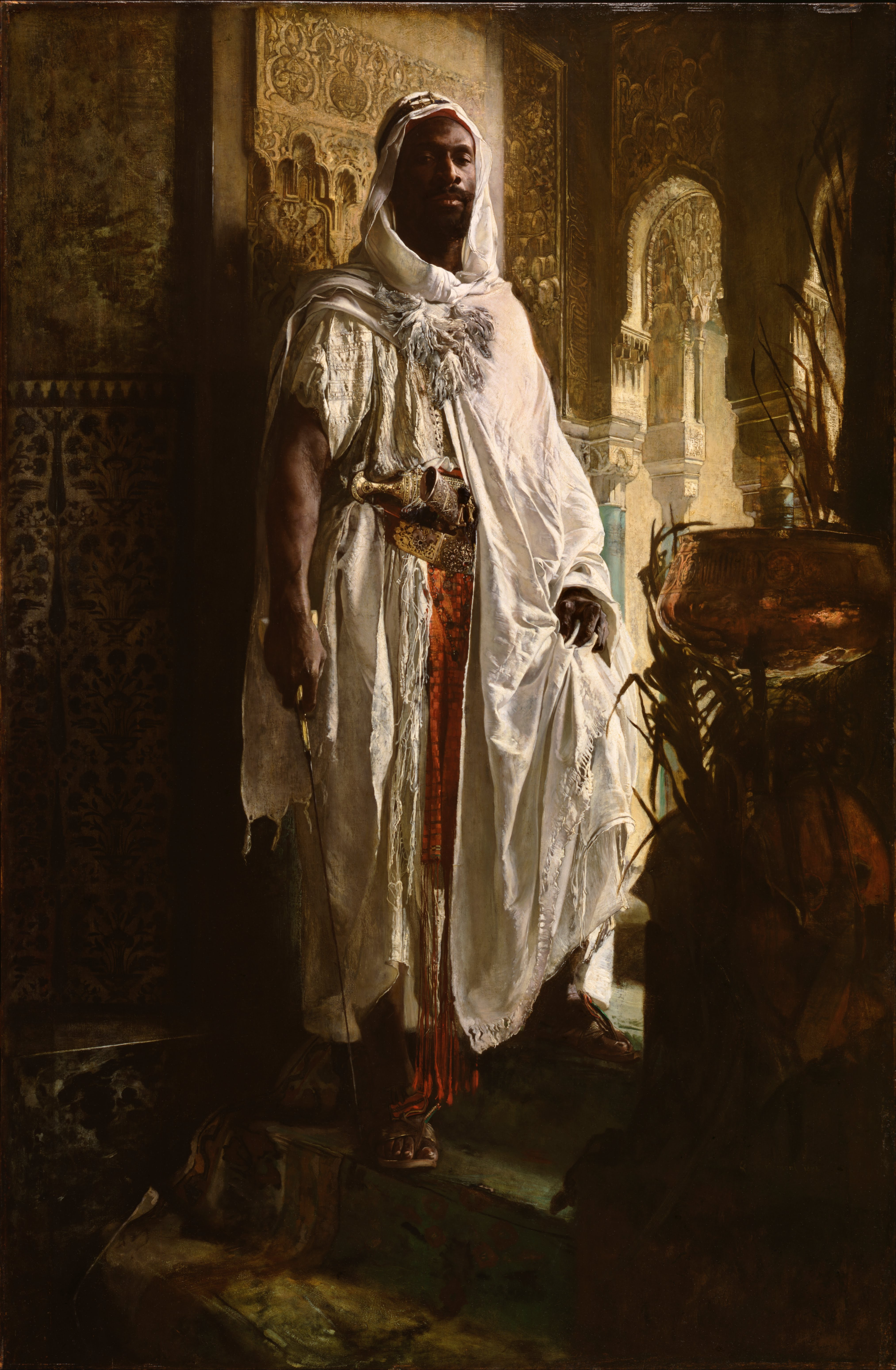
The Moorish Chief (1878), Eduard Charlemont.

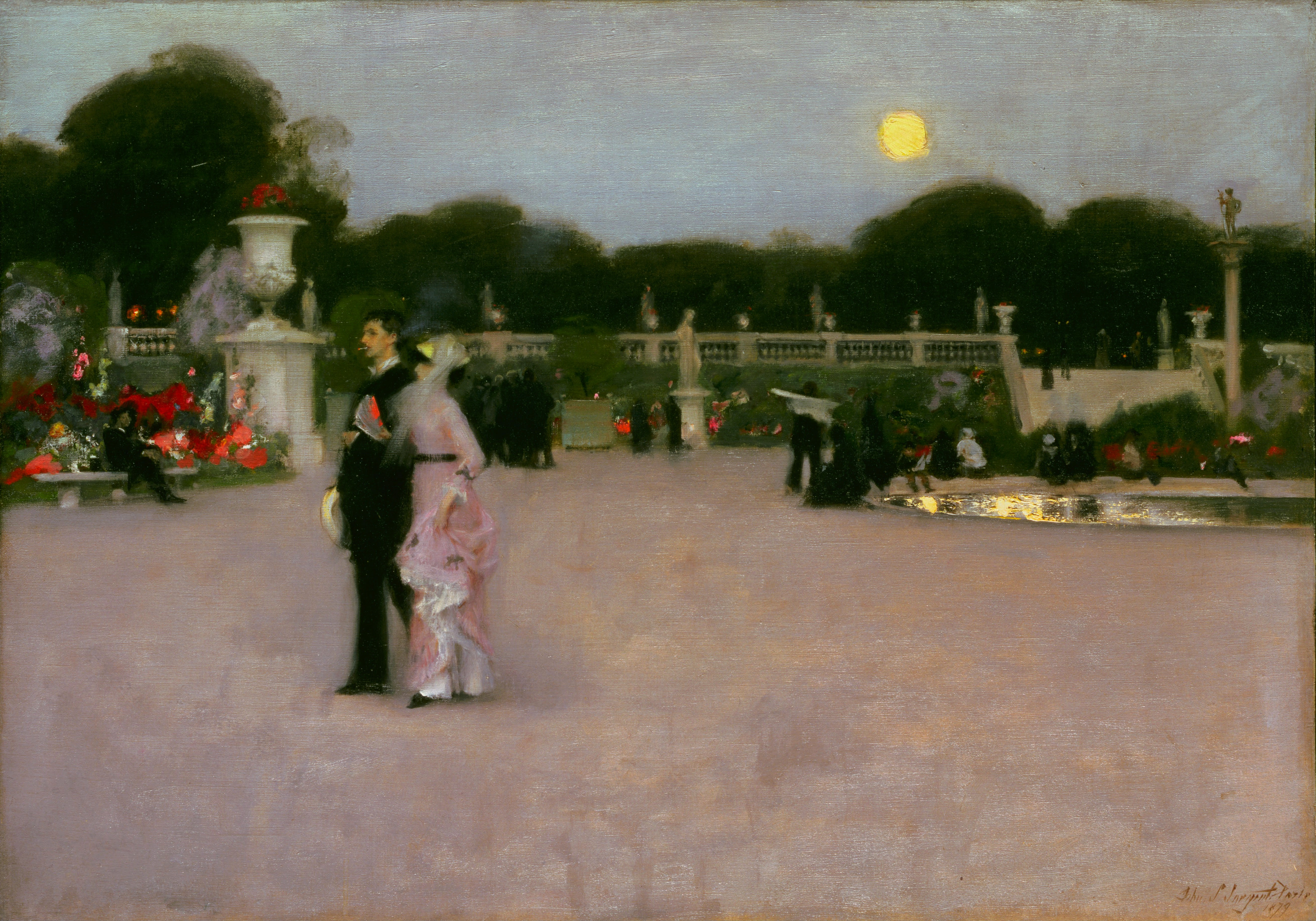
In the Luxembourg Gardens (1879), John Singer Sargent.

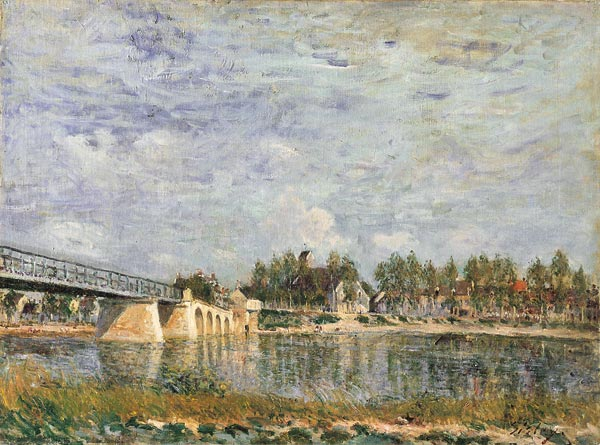
The Bridge at Saint-Mammès (1881), Alfred Sisley.

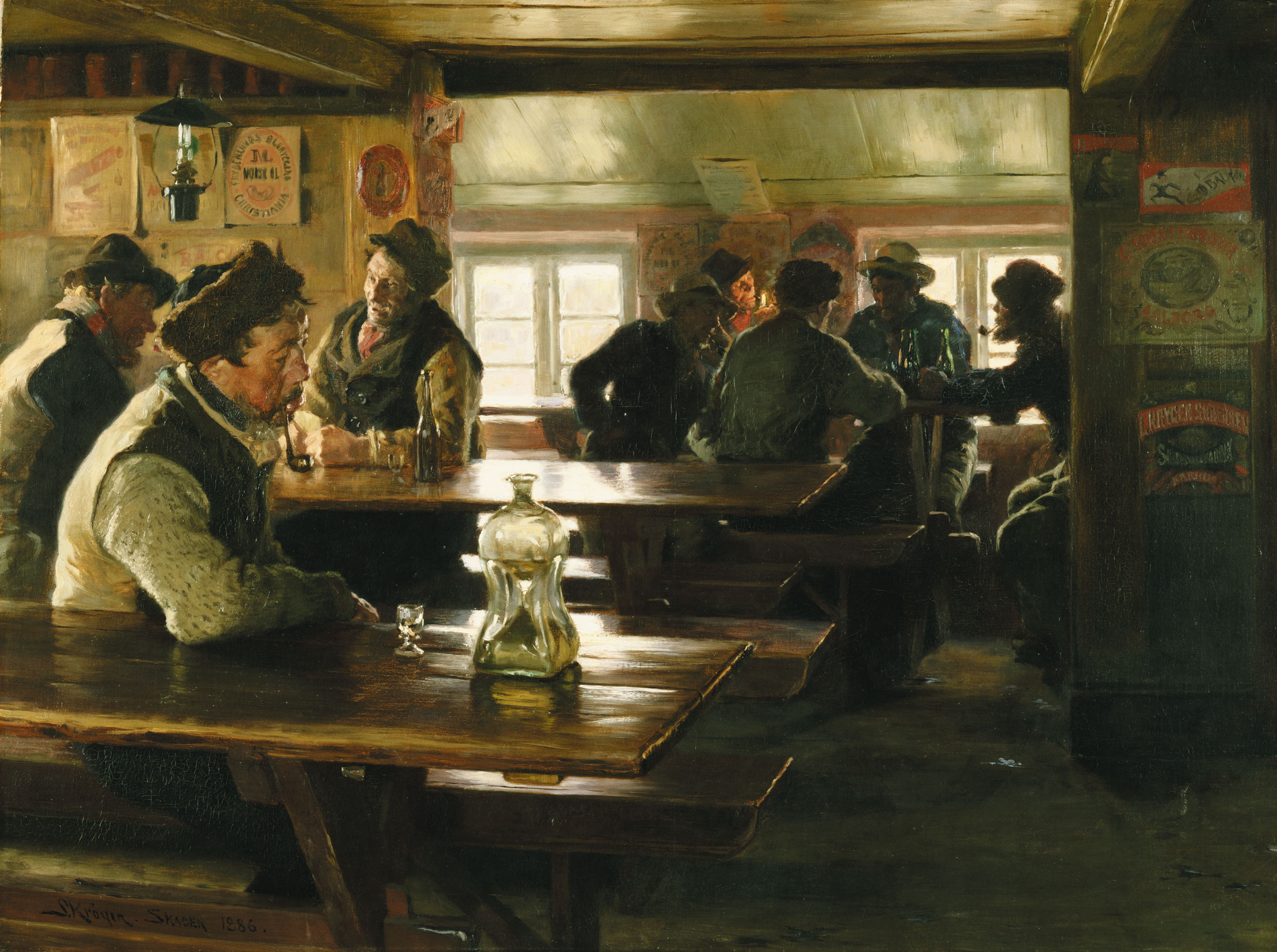
In Merchant Winthers Tavern in Skagen (1886), Peder Severin Krøyer.

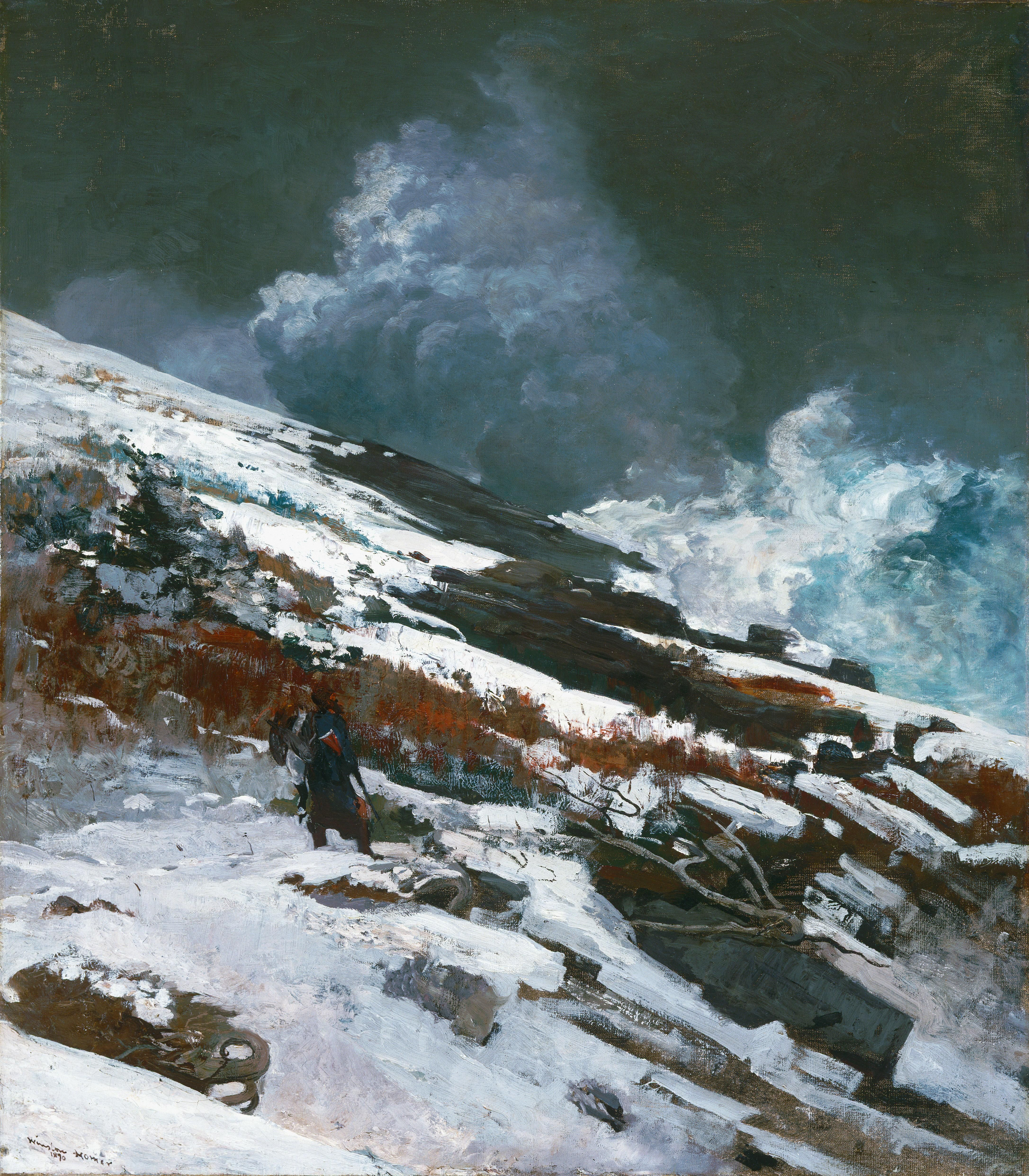
Winter Coast (1890), Winslow Homer.

== See also ==
- Henri Gabriel Marceau, curator of the Johnson Collection, 1929–1969
