= Fiske Kimball =

American architect (1888–1955)

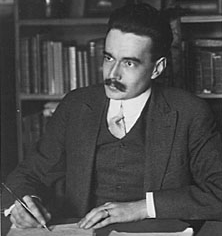
- Kimball, c. 1915
- Born: Sidney Fiske Kimball; December 8, 1888; Newton, Massachusetts, U.S.
- Died: August 15, 1955 (aged 66); Munich, Germany
- Education: Harvard University; University of Michigan
- Occupation: Architect

Sidney Fiske Kimball (1888–1955) was an American architect, architectural historian and museum director. A pioneer in the field of architectural preservation in the United States, he played a leading part in the restoration of Monticello and Stratford Hall Plantation in Virginia.

Over his nearly 30-year tenure as director of the Philadelphia Museum of Art, he moved the museum into its current building and greatly expanded its collections.

== Biography ==
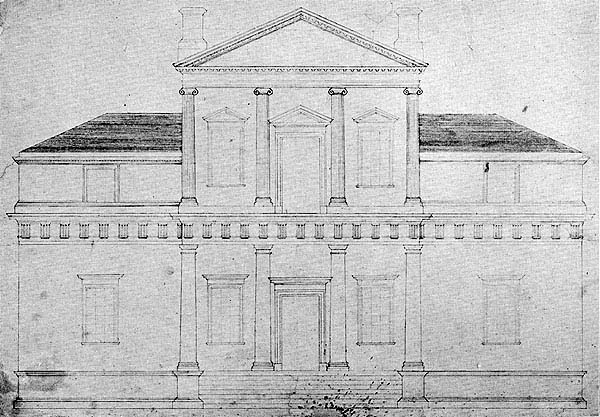
Thomas Jefferson's drawing of original front elevation of Monticello. Illustration in Fiske Kimball's Domestic Architecture of the American Colonies and of the Early Republic, 1922

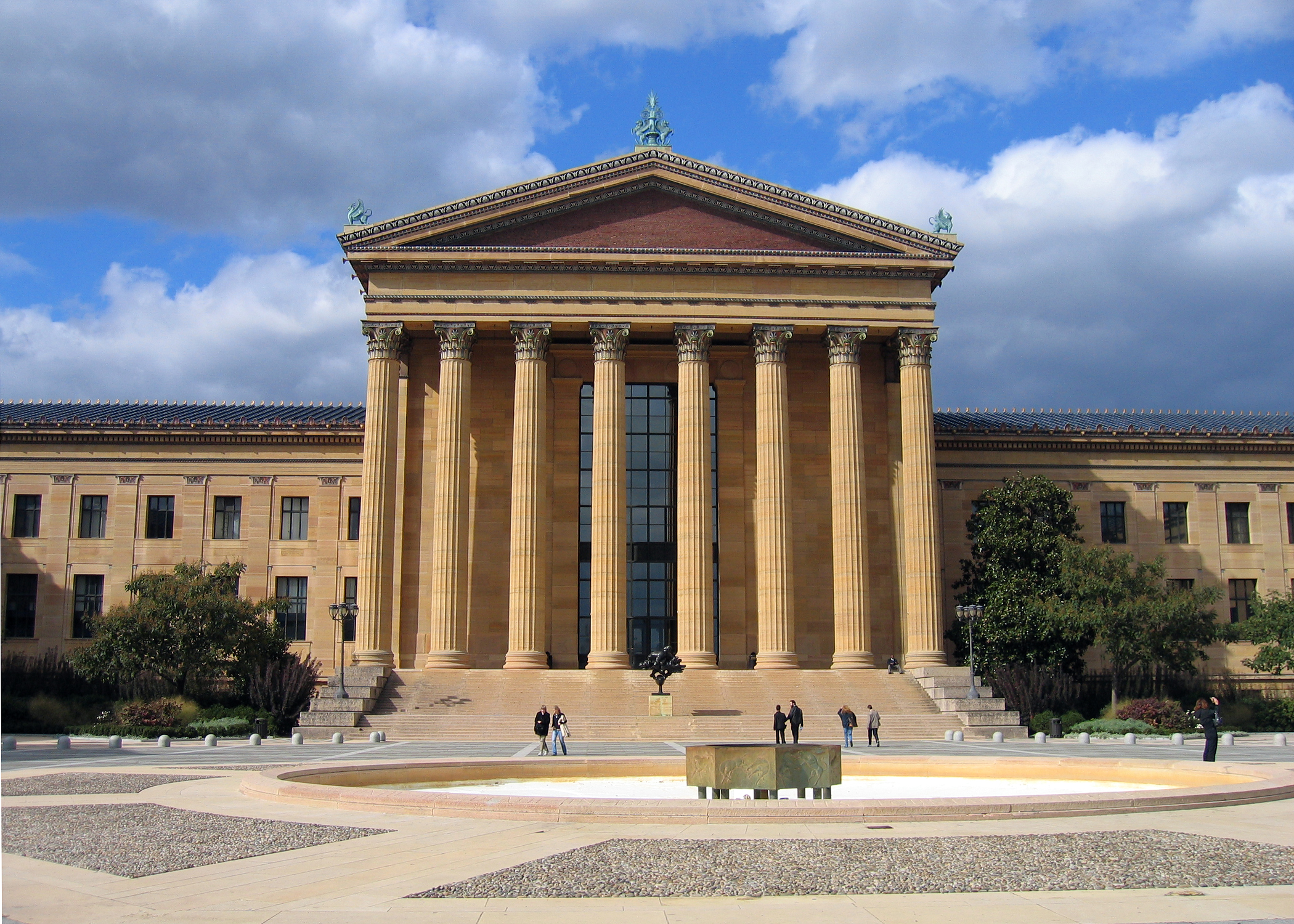
Philadelphia Museum of Art's East Entrance

Kimball was born in Newton, Massachusetts on December 8, 1888.

He was educated at Harvard University, where he took both his bachelor's and master's degrees in architecture. Kimball was awarded a Sheldon Fellowship for travel to Europe in 1911 and passed his assistantship in the library to his sister Theodora Kimball Hubbard during his absence. This opportunity propelled his sister's career as the first Landscape Architecture Librarian at Harvard University. He then taught at the University of Illinois and the University of Michigan, receiving a Ph.D. from the latter institution in 1915. In 1919, Kimball was appointed to head the newly formed department of art and architecture at the University of Virginia. While at the University of Virginia, he served as the supervising architect for Memorial Gymnasium (built in 1924), and the McIntire Amphitheatre on grounds at the university. He also designed the campus of Woodberry Forest School.

In 1923, Kimball left the University of Virginia to establish the Institute of Fine Arts at New York University. In 1925, he was appointed director of the Philadelphia Museum of Art, where he served until his retirement in January 1955. During his first year in Philadelphia, he lived in and restored the Lemon Hill mansion. Kimball was a consultant on numerous other restoration projects, including Monticello, Gunston Hall, Stratford Hall, and Colonial Williamsburg. He was elected to the American Philosophical Society in 1943.

Kimball continued to work on projects in Virginia. Kimball designed his own home, Shack Mountain, in Albemarle County, Virginia, not far from Monticello. Kimball used Jefferson's architectural principles as the basis of his design of Shack Mountain, short for Shackelford Mountain, the surname of a branch of Jefferson's descendants. Built in 1935–1936, Shack Mountain is a Jefferson-style pavilion, like Monticello, that is considered Kimball's masterpiece. Shack Mountain was designated a National Historic Landmark in 1992.

Fiske Kimball died in Munich, Germany, on August 14, 1955. He and his wife are buried at Monticello Memorial Gardens on Monticello Mountain, about a mile from Monticello. He is commemorated by the Fiske Kimball Fine Arts Library at the University of Virginia.

== Marriage ==
Kimball married, in June 1913, Marie Christina Goebel (1889–1955), the half Dutch, half German daughter of Julius Goebel, a professor of Germanic languages at the University of Illinois. She eventually was the recipient of two Guggenheim Fellowships and served as Monticello's first curator (1944–55). She also wrote a three-volume biography of Jefferson.

== Works ==
- Thomas Jefferson, architect, Original Designs in the Collection of Thomas Jefferson Coolidge, Junior, 1916
- A History of Architecture, 1918 (with George Harold Edgell)
- Domestic Architecture of the American Colonies and of the early Republic, 1922
- American Architecture, 1928
- Mr. Samuel McIntire, Carver : The architect of Salem, 1940
- The Creation of the Rococo, 1943
- Great Paintings in America: One Hundred and One Masterpieces in Color, 1948 (with Lionello Venturi)

== See also ==
- List of Directors of the Philadelphia Museum of Art

Cultural offices
Preceded by Langdon Warner	Director of the Philadelphia Museum of Art; 1925–1955	Succeeded by Henri Gabriel Marceau
