= Marie Goebel Kimball =

American historian

Marie Goebel Kimball (June 7, 1889 – March 2, 1955) was an author, historian, and Jefferson scholar who served as the first curator of Monticello from 1944 until her death in 1955. During her career, she published more than 30 books, articles, and book reviews about Jefferson, Monticello, early America, and decorative arts.

== Biography ==
Born in Hackensack, New Jersey, on June 7, 1889, to Julius Goebel (1857-1931) and Kathryn Vreeland (1861-1932), Kimball studied at Radcliffe College before taking her degree in literature and arts at the University of Illinois in 1911. She married Fiske Kimball on June 7, 1913.

Early investigations into Thomas Jefferson's papers by Marie Kimball were later carried on by her husband and developed into his folio publication, Thomas Jefferson Architect (1916). During this time period, Kimball began publishing her own research into various aspects of Thomas Jefferson's life, including "A Playmate of Thomas Jefferson" (North American Review, 1921), and "William Short, Jefferson's Only 'Son'" (North American Review, 1926).

In 1924, Fiske Kimball was appointed to the restoration committee of the Thomas Jefferson Memorial Foundation, whose mission was to preserve Monticello and operate it as a historic site. In 1927, Marie Kimball began documentary research to support the TJMF's interior restoration efforts; her research was published in a two-part article in Antiques later that year. Kimball continued to be involved in the restoration and running of Monticello until shortly before her death, and was named curator in 1944.

In addition to her work at Monticello, Kimball published a number of books and articles, including Thomas Jefferson's Cook Book (1938) and three volumes of a projected five-volume biography of Jefferson: Jefferson, the Road to Glory, 1743 to 1776 (1943); Jefferson, War and Peace, 1776 to 1784 (1947); and Jefferson, the Scene of Europe, 1784 to 1789 (1950). She received two Guggenheim Fellowships, in 1945 and 1946.

Marie Kimball died on March 2, 1955, in Philadelphia.

== Works ==
- Thomas Jefferson's Cook Book. Richmond: Garrett & Massie, 1938.
- The Martha Washington Cook Book. New York, NY: Coward-McCann, 1940.
- Jefferson: The Road to Glory, 1743 to 1776. New York, NY: Coward-McCann, 1943.
- Jefferson: War and Peace, 1776 to 1784. New York, NY: Coward-McCann, 1947.
- Jefferson: The Scene of Europe, 1784 to 1789. New York, NY: Coward-McCann, 1950.
