= Henri Gabriel Marceau =

American architect

Henri Gabriel Marceau (12 June 1896, in Richmond, Virginia – 15 September 1969, in Philadelphia, Pennsylvania) was an American architect, teacher, art historian and museum curator. He served as Director of the Philadelphia Museum of Art, 1955–1964.

== Career ==
He studied architecture at Columbia University, but his education was interrupted by military service in World War I. He graduated from Columbia in 1921, and spent that summer in France rebuilding war-damaged buildings. He won the 1922 Prix de Rome in architecture, studying for the next three years at the American Academy in Rome. In 1926, he was named assistant curator of the John G. Johnson Collection, a vast collection of Old Master paintings that had been bequeathed to the City of Philadelphia in 1917, with the restriction that it continue to be exhibited in Johnson's mansion. He taught at the University of Pennsylvania School of Architecture, 1926–29.

=== Philadelphia Museum of Art ===
Marceau left Penn in 1929 to become curator of fine arts at the Philadelphia Museum of Art and curator of the Johnson Collection. PMA's massive new building had opened in March 1928, but with only about a sixth of its planned galleries completed. In 1931, more than 1000 unexhibited Johnson Collection works were transferred to PMA for storage. Philadelphia's fire marshall subsequently found Johnson's mansion at 510 South Broad Street not to be fireproof, and the 275 works exhibited there were "temporarily" transferred to PMA in June 1933. In addition to his other positions, Marceau remained curator of the Johnson Collection until his death in 1969.

Marceau was named PMA curator of paintings in 1933, chief of the department of paintings and sculpture in 1937, and associate museum director also in 1937. He succeeded Fiske Kimball as director of PMA in 1955.

He curated exhibitions on a wide range of artists, including Thomas Eakins, William Rush, Benjamin West, Cezanne, Corot, and others. He organized three international exhibitions of contemporary sculpture at PMA—1933, 1940, and 1949.

The Johnson Collection remains on permanent loan to PMA. Following more than a half century of exhibition as a separate collection, its works now are integrated into PMA's other holdings.

== Published works ==
Marceau wrote numerous articles for the Philadelphia Museum of Art Bulletin and other PMA publications. He authored or co-authored a number of exhibition catalogues:

- Flowers in Art: An Exhibition, exhibition catalogue, Philadelphia Museum of Art, 1933, with Horace H. F. Jayne
- William Rush, 1756–1833: The First Native American Sculptor, exhibition catalogue, Philadelphia Museum of Art, 1937
- Benjamin West, 1738–1820, exhibition catalogue, Philadelphia Museum of Art, 1938
- The Worcester-Philadelphia Exhibition of Flemish Painting, exhibition catalogue, Worcester Art Museum and Philadelphia Museum of Art, 1939, with Perry Blythe Cott
- Daumier: Draftsman, Painter, exhibition catalogue, Walters Art Gallery, 1940, with David Rosen
- Catalogue of Paintings in the John G. Johnson Collection, 1941
- Thomas Eakins Centennial Exhibition, exhibition catalogue, Philadelphia Museum of Art, 1944, with Lloyd Goodrich
- Corot, 1796–1895, exhibition catalogue, Philadelphia Museum of Art, 1946
- Diamond Jubilee Exhibition; Masterpieces in America, exhibition catalogue, Philadelphia Museum of Art, 1950
- Handbook of the Philadelphia Museum of Art, 1960

== Honors ==
Marceau was elected a member of the American Philosophical Society (1949), and served as a member of the Philadelphia Art Commission and the Fairmount Park Art Association. Belgium made him a Chevalier of the Order of the Crown, and France made him a Chevalier of the National Order of the Legion of Honor.

== See also ==
- List of Directors of the Philadelphia Museum of Art

Cultural offices
Preceded by Fiske Kimball	Director of the Philadelphia Museum of Art; 1955–1964	Succeeded by Evan Hopkins Turner
