= Virgin and Child Enthroned =

Painting attributed to Rogier van der Weyden

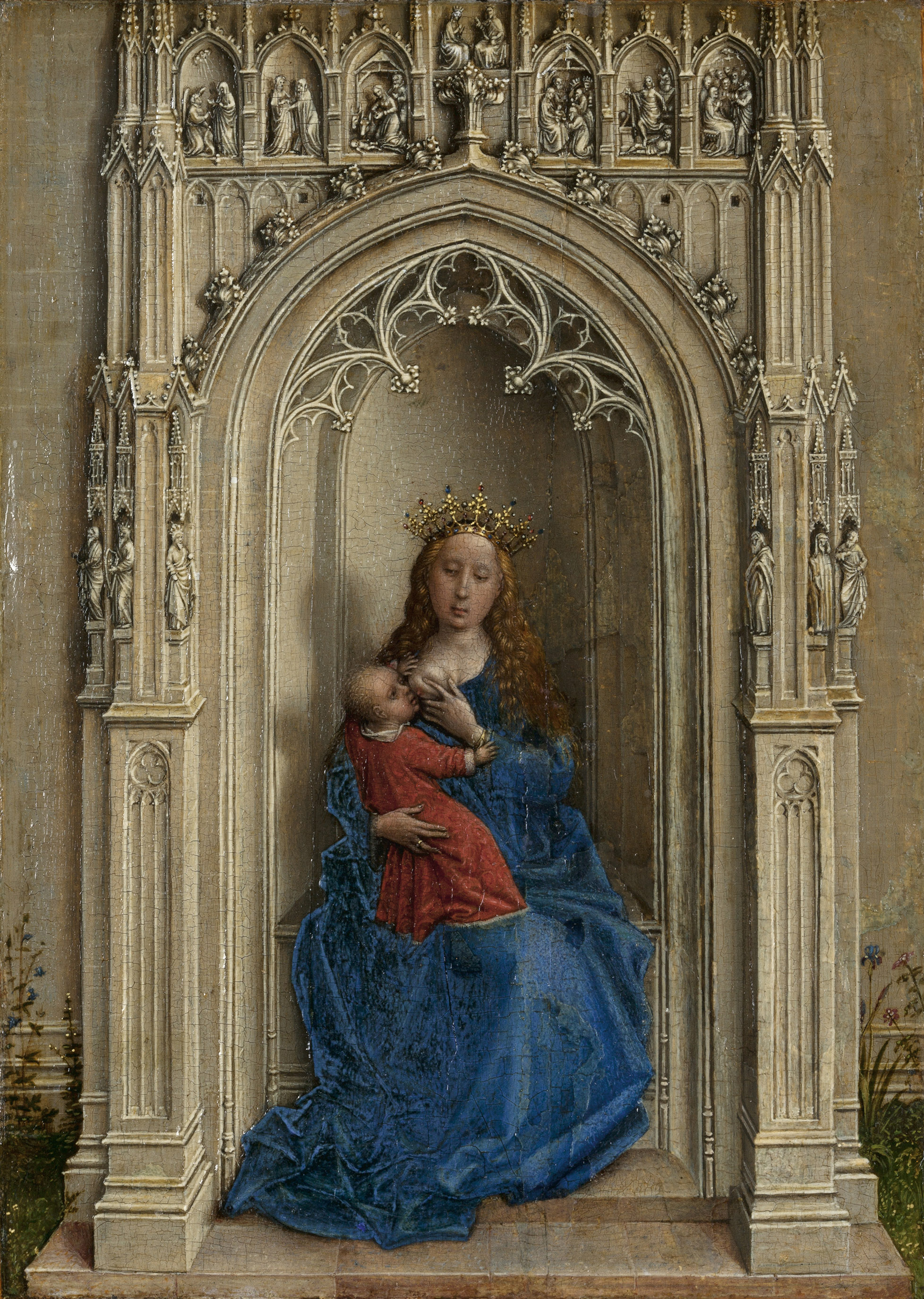
- Artist: Rogier van der Weyden
- Year: c. 1430–1432
- Medium: oil on panel
- Dimensions: 15.8 cm × 11.4 cm (6.2 in × 4.5 in)
- Location: Museo Thyssen-Bornemisza, Madrid

The Virgin and Child Enthroned (also known as the Thyssen Madonna) is a small oil-on-oak panel painting dated c. 1433, usually attributed to the Early Netherlandish artist Rogier van der Weyden. It is closely related to his Madonna Standing, completed during the same period. The panel is filled with Christian iconography, including representations of prophets, the Annunciation, Christ's infancy and resurrection, and Mary's Coronation. It is generally accepted as the earliest extant work by van der Weyden, one of three works attributed to him of the Virgin and Child enclosed in a niche on an exterior wall of a Gothic church. The panel is housed in the Museo Thyssen-Bornemisza in Madrid.

The panel seems to be the left-hand wing of a dismantled diptych, perhaps with the Saint George and the Dragon panel now in the National Gallery of Art, Washington, D.C. As an early van der Weyden, it takes influence from Robert Campin and Jan van Eyck. Van der Weyden served his apprenticeship under Campin, and the older master's style is noticeable in the architecture of the niche, the Virgin's facial type, her exposed breast and the treatment of her hair.

== Description ==
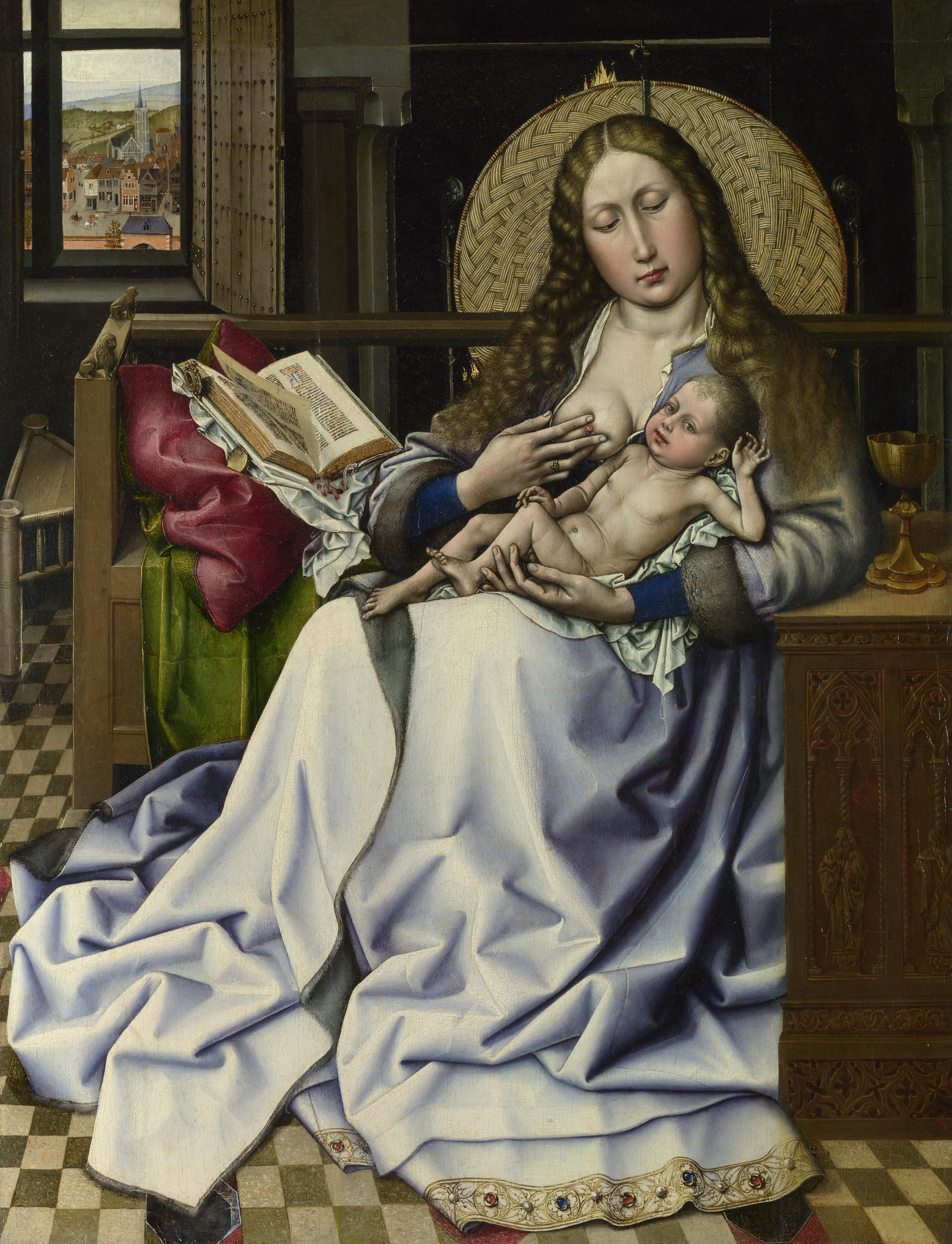
Robert Campin, The Virgin and Child before a Firescreen, c. 1430, National Gallery, London

The panel is the smallest extant work by van der Weyden and follows the tradition of a Madonna Lactans, with significant differences. Christ is dressed in a red garment, as opposed to the swaddling he usually wears in 15th-century Virgin and Child portrayals. This is one of two exceptions where he is fully clothed; the other is Robert Campin's Madonna in Frankfurt, where he is shown in blue clothing. Mary's unbound blond hair falls across her shoulders and down across her arms. Showing the influence of Campin, it is brushed behind the ears. She wears a crown as Queen of Heaven and a ring on a finger as the Bride of Christ. Reinforcing this, the blue colour of her robe alludes to her devotion and fidelity to her son. The folds of her dress are reminiscent of the lengthy, crisp, curved intertwined gowns of Gothic sculpture.

The pictorial space is bathed in soft light, probably an influence from Jan van Eyck. The light falls from the right, throwing shadows of both Mary and the Child's heads on the left wall of the niche. The Virgin and Child are shown seated in a small Gothic chapel or oratory projecting from a wall and opening onto a lawn. The painting pays very close attention to small realistic detail; for example, there are four small holes above each arch, likely to hold scaffolding.

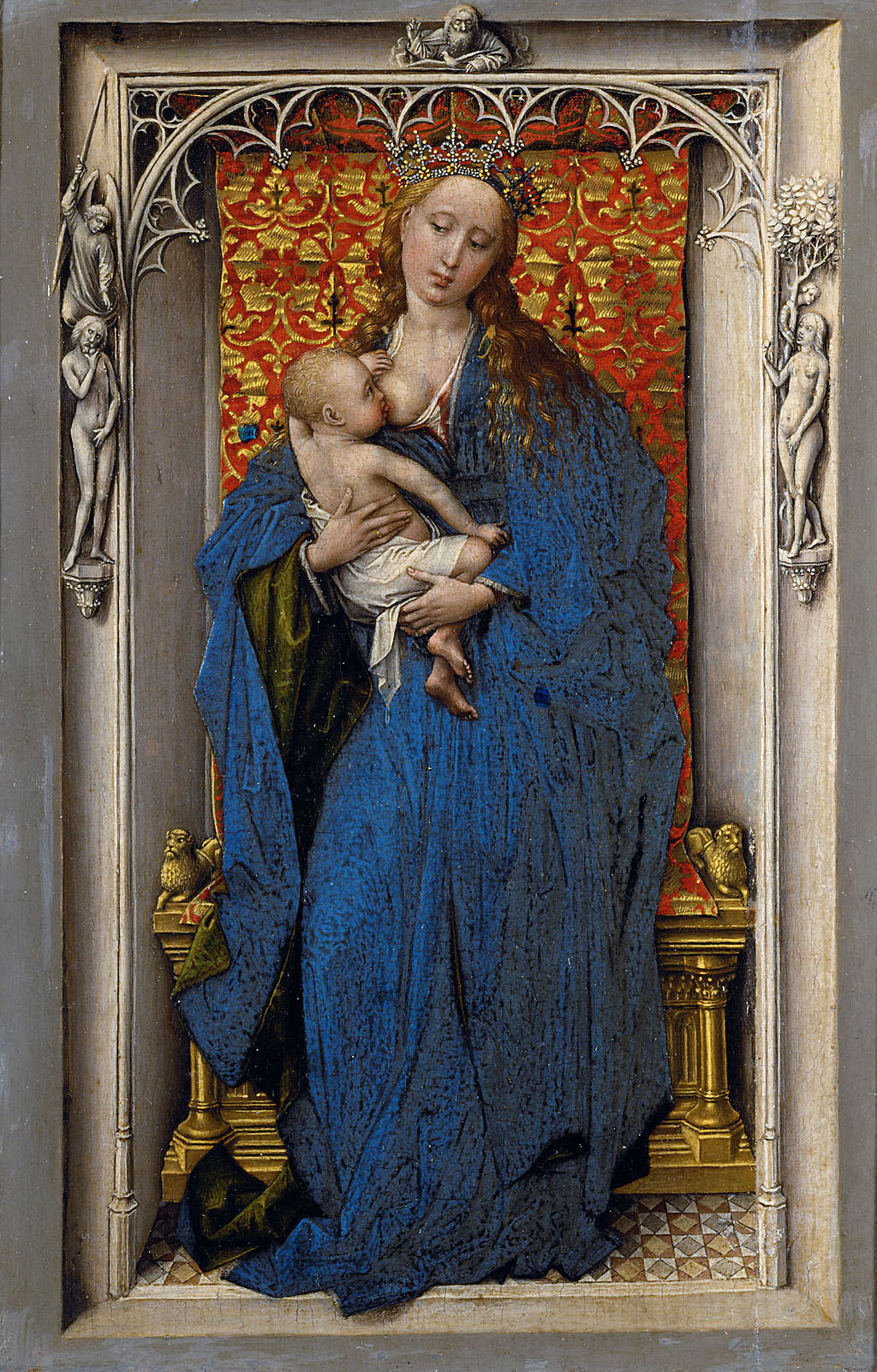
Van der Weyden, The Madonna Standing, c. 1430–32, Kunsthistorisches Museum, Vienna

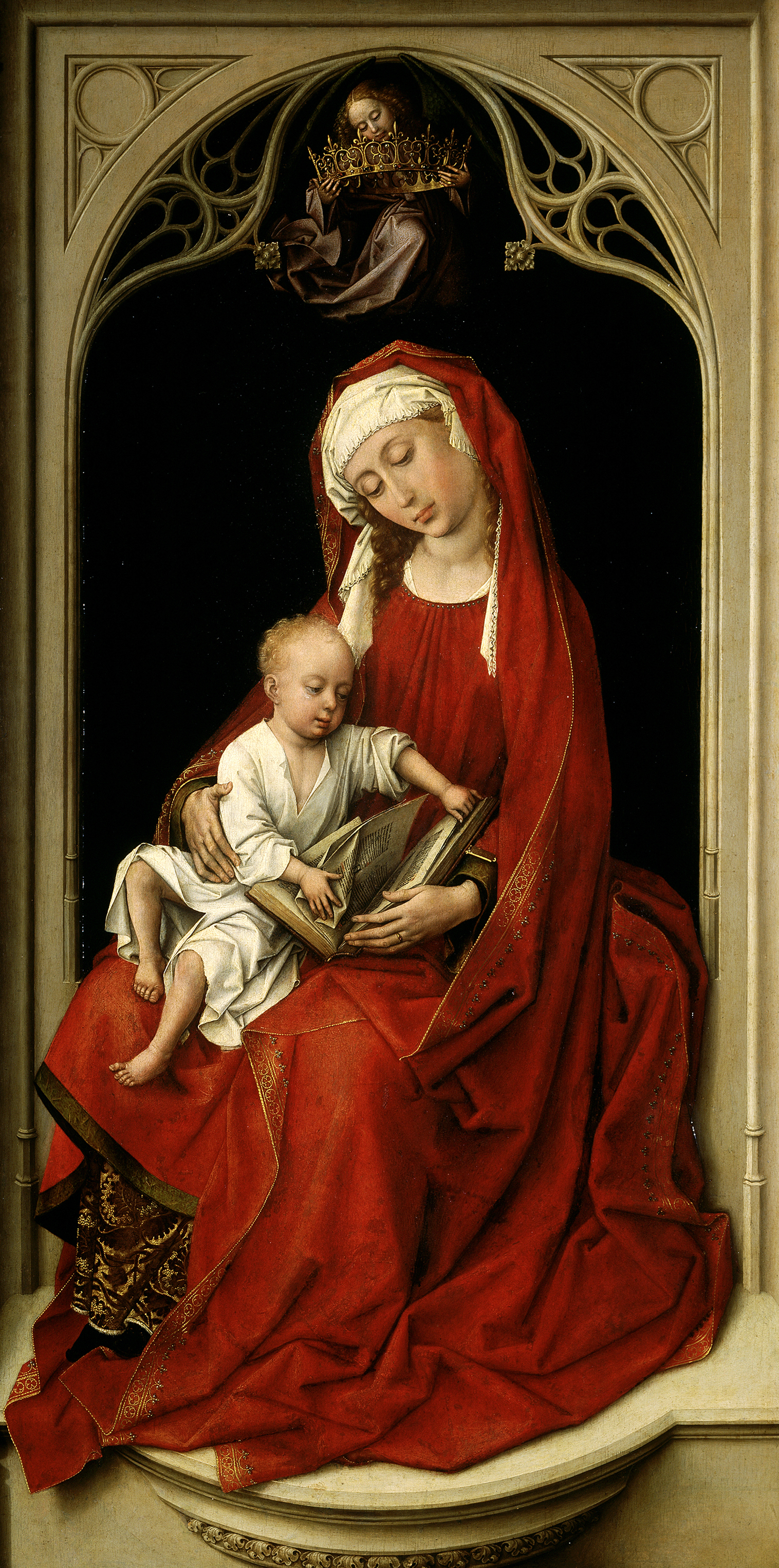
Van der Weyden, The Durán Madonna, c. 1435–38, Museo del Prado, Madrid

As with other early van der Weyden depictions of the Madonna, her head is slightly too large for her body. Her dress is creased and almost paper-like. However, the description of her lap contains inconsistencies also in Campin's Virgin and Child before a Firescreen; it appears to lack volume and is if she had only one leg. This seems to reflect an early difficulty both with foreshortening and in the depiction of a body under clothing.

The chapel is unrealistically small compared to the Virgin; van der Weyden's intention was to emphasise the Virgin's presence while also symbolically representing the Church and the entire doctrine of the Redemption. The panel is one of three surviving of van der Weyden's in which both Madonna and Child are enclosed in this way. However it is unusual in that the niche exists as a separate feature within the picture, compared to the two other works where the enclosure is coterminous with the edge of the painting, almost as part of the frame, a reason why it is thought to predate The Madonna Standing.

There are symmetrical differences between the left- and right-hand sides of the painting. This is most noticeable with the buttress, where the receding edges are over half again the size of those on the front sides. In addition, the breadth of the buttress contradicts the spatial depth of the much tighter space inhabited by the Virgin and Child. This is a technical issue with foreshortening Campin also struggled with, but which van der Weyden resolves in his mature work.

== Iconography ==
The work is rich in symbolism and iconographic elements, to an extent far more pronounced than that in The Madonna Standing. An iris grows to the side of the aedicula, representing the Virgin's sorrow at the Passion, and on the other side a columbine, recalling the Sorrows of the Virgin. This symbolic use of flowers is again a van Eyckian motif. While they may appear incongruous with the architectural setting, this was probably the effect that van der Weyden was seeking.

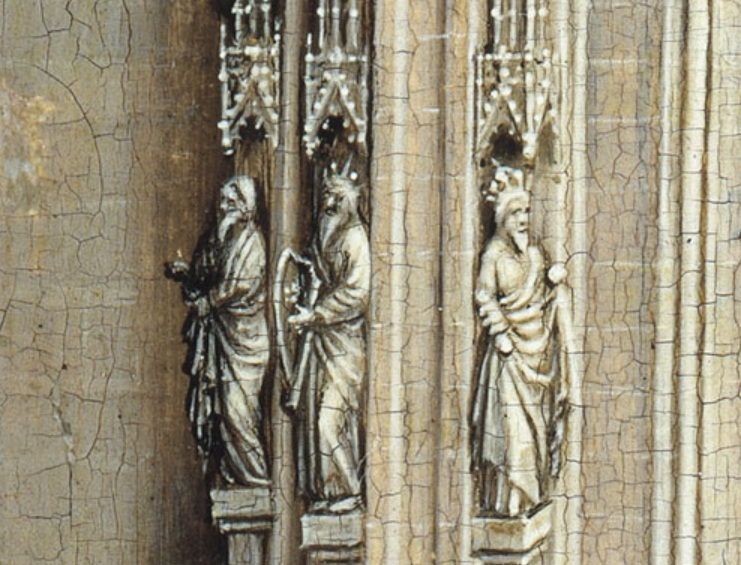
Figures to the left of the Virgin. David, standing in the centre, holds a harp.

The lintel contains six reliefs from the New Testament of scenes from the Life of the Virgin. The first four, the Annunciation, Visitation, Nativity and Adoration of the Magi, are associated with motherhood and infancy. They are followed by the Resurrection and Pentecost. Above them, surmounting a "cross flower", is the Coronation of the Virgin. The jambs on either side of the Virgin are adorned with statues, most likely of Old Testament prophets. Of these only David, second to the left, has been identified. The bearded man to David's left is probably Moses, the man in the cap to the right is most likely the "weeping prophet" Jeremiah. On the opposite side, the outer figures may be Zechariah and Isaiah.

In his usage of grisaille, van der Weyden distinguishes between the earthly realm of flesh and blood, and the divine, represented by ancient sculptural figures, who appear frozen in time. Art historian Shirley Blum believes these figures were relegated to the architectural elements so as not to crowd the central devotional image.

The arrangement of the sculptural elements may have been influenced by Claus Sluter's Well of Moses (c. 1395–1403), which has a similar alignment. In the Chartreuse de Champmol, the prophets represent the judges of Christ (Secundum legem debet mori, "according to that law he ought to die") and are thus tied to the crucifixion. In the van der Weyden they are associated with the Virgin. Although portraying figures in niches has a long tradition in Northern art, rendering the figures as sculpture was unique to the 1430s, and first appears in van Eyck's Ghent Altarpiece.

== Diptych ==
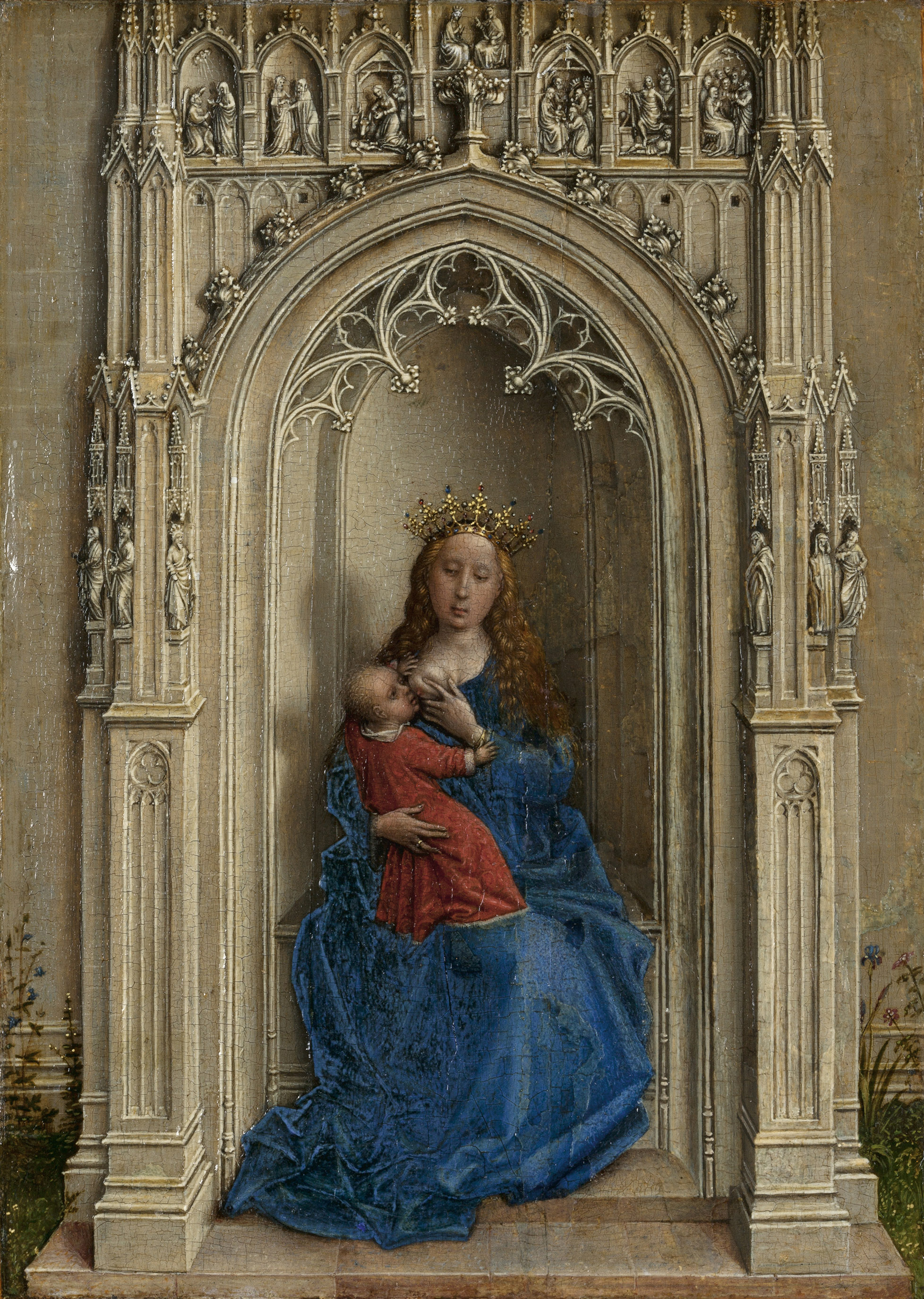
Virgin and Child Enthroned

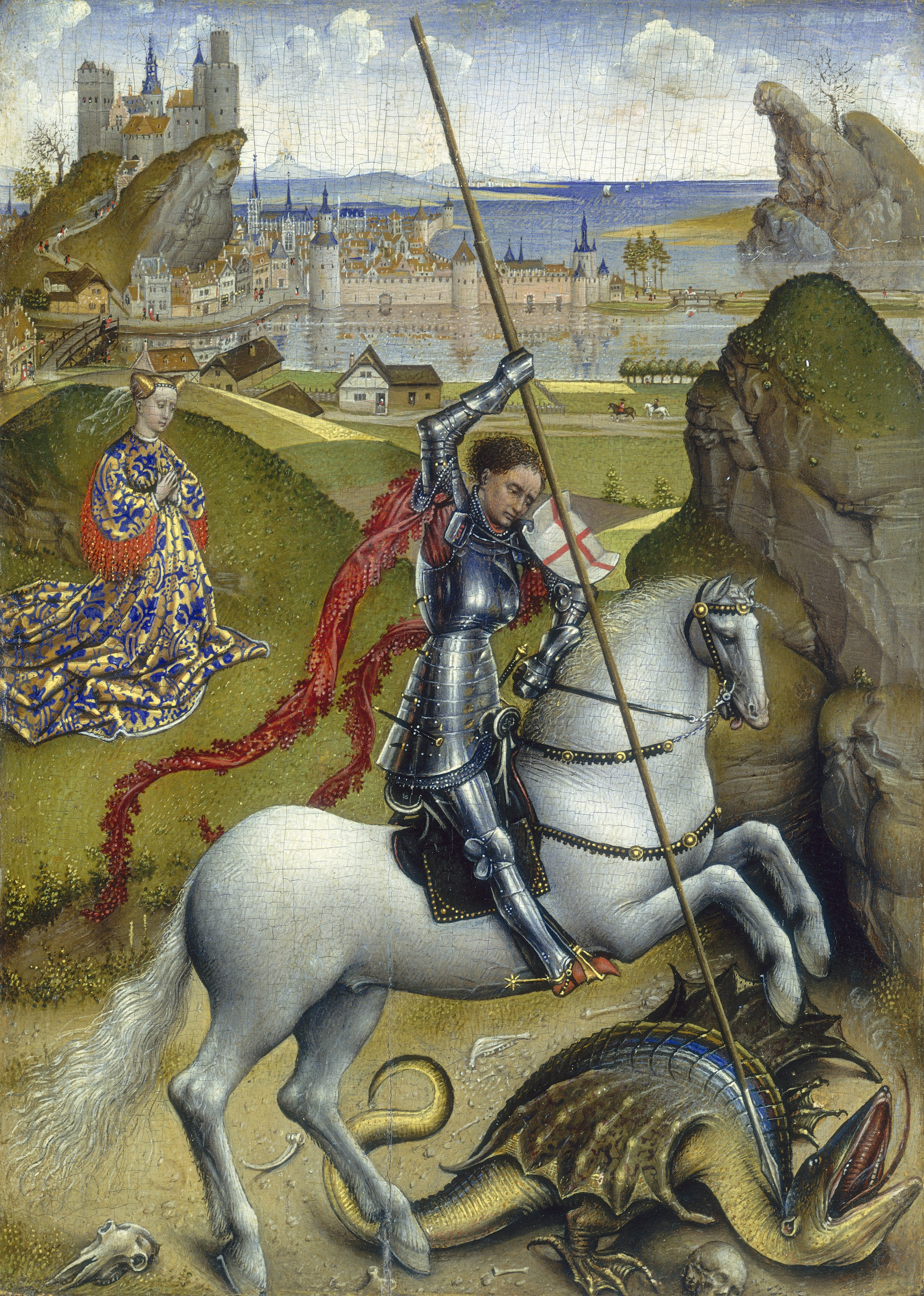
Saint George and the Dragon, National Gallery of Art, Washington, D.C.

The panel may have been conceived as either the left-hand wing of a since dismantled diptych, or as the front piece of a double-sided panel. Art historian Erwin Panofsky suggests that the Washington Saint George and the Dragon of 1432–35 is the most likely opposite wing. In that work, St. George, facing inwards and to the right, slays the dragon before a Libyan princess. Although the pairing might seem incongruous, his Madonna Standing is widely thought to have been attached with the St. Catherine of Alexandria in Vienna. In both panels, the saints face inwards and are within fully realised landscapes. In contrast, in both left-hand panels, the Madonna and Child are positioned frontally (although eye contact is avoided) and isolated within cold grisaille architectural spaces.

Blum suggests that van der Weyden sought to juxtapose the otherworldly realm of the Madonna and Child with the earthly setting and contemporary dress of the saints. She describes the couplings as serving to position each saint "as a 'living witness' to the static, eternal presence of the Virgin and Child". She writes that "Only in such early works do we find this kind of obvious solution. By the time of the Descent from the Cross and Durán Madonna, van der Weyden has already worked out a far more complex and effective means of mixing temporal and non-temporal effects".

== Dating and attribution ==
The panel closely resembles van der Weyden's c. 1430–1432 Madonna Standing, and seems influenced by the work of Robert Campin, under whom he served his apprenticeship. It is especially close to Campin's 1430 Virgin and Child before a Firescreen, now in London; one of the last works Campin completed before van der Weyden left his studio on 1 August 1432. In both, the Virgin has large, full, breasts, her fingers pressing as she nurses the Child. There are further similarities in her facial features and expression; the colour, style, and position of her hair; as well her pose. Lorne Campbell attributes the work to van der Weyden's workshop, while art historian John Ward credits it to Campin and gives a date of c. 1435.

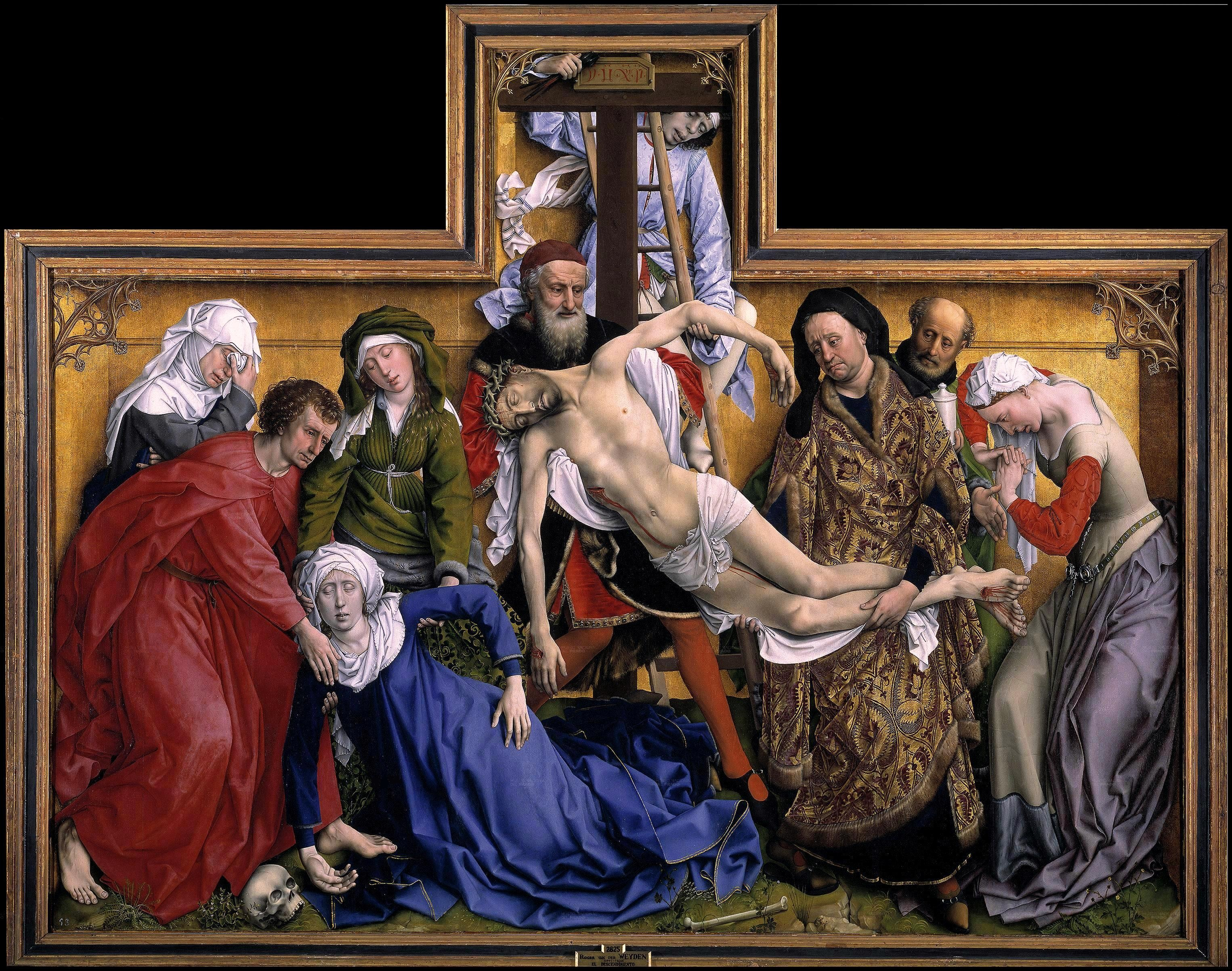
In van der Weyden's Descent from the Cross, flesh and blood figures take on a distinctly sculptural appearance.

Ward's thesis is based on the fact that the Thyssen panel, so named after its home at the Thyssen-Bornemisza Museum, is overwhelmingly influenced by Campin, while the contemporaneous and more sophisticated Madonna Standing draws heavily from van Eyck. He finds such a sudden shift unlikely, while also pointing out that this work evidences some technical difficulties that Campin was never to resolve, especially in respect to foreshortening and the rendering of the body beneath the robes. He also points to the architectural similarities in Campin's Marriage of Mary, although this may be a matter of influence.

The painting was completed early in van der Weyden's career, probably just after his apprenticeship with Robert Campin ended. Although highly accomplished, it is filled with symbolism of a kind absent from his more mature works. It is one of three attributed paintings, all early works, that show the Virgin and Child set within an architectural setting, surrounded with painted sculptural figures, the others being The Madonna Standing and the Durán Madonna.

Sculptural figuration was to become a hallmark of van der Weyden's mature work, and is best typified by the Madrid Descent, where the mourning figures are shaped and take on poses more usually seen in sculpture. Erwin Panofsky identified this work and The Madonna Standing as van der Weyden's earliest extant work; they are also his smallest panels. Panofsky dated both panels as 1432–34, and believed them to be early works based on stylistic reasons, their near miniature scale, and because of the evident influences of both Campin and van Eyck.

== Sources ==
- Acres, Alfred. "Rogier van der Weyden's Painted Texts". Artibus et Historiae, Volume 21, No. 41, 2000
- Birkmeyer, Karl. "Notes on the Two Earliest Paintings by Rogier van der Weyden". The Art Bulletin, Volume 44, No. 4, 1962
- Blum, Shirley Neilsen. "Symbolic Invention in the Art of Rogier van der Weyden". Journal of Art History, Volume 46, Issues 1–4, 1977
- Clark, Kenneth. Looking at Pictures. New York: Holt Rinehart and Winston, 1960. ISBN 978-0-7195-2704-3
- Hand, John Oliver; Metzger, Catherine; Spronk, Ron. Prayers and Portraits: Unfolding the Netherlandish Diptych. New Haven, CT: Yale University Press, 2006. ISBN 978-0-300-12155-1
- Panofsky, Erwin. Early Netherlandish Painting: v. 1. Boulder CO: Westview Press, 1971. ISBN 978-0-06-430002-5
- Ward, John. "A New Attribution for the Madonna Enthroned in the Thyssen Bornemisza Collection". The Art Bulletin, Volume 50, No. 4, 1968
