= Durán Madonna =

Painting by Rogier van der Weyden

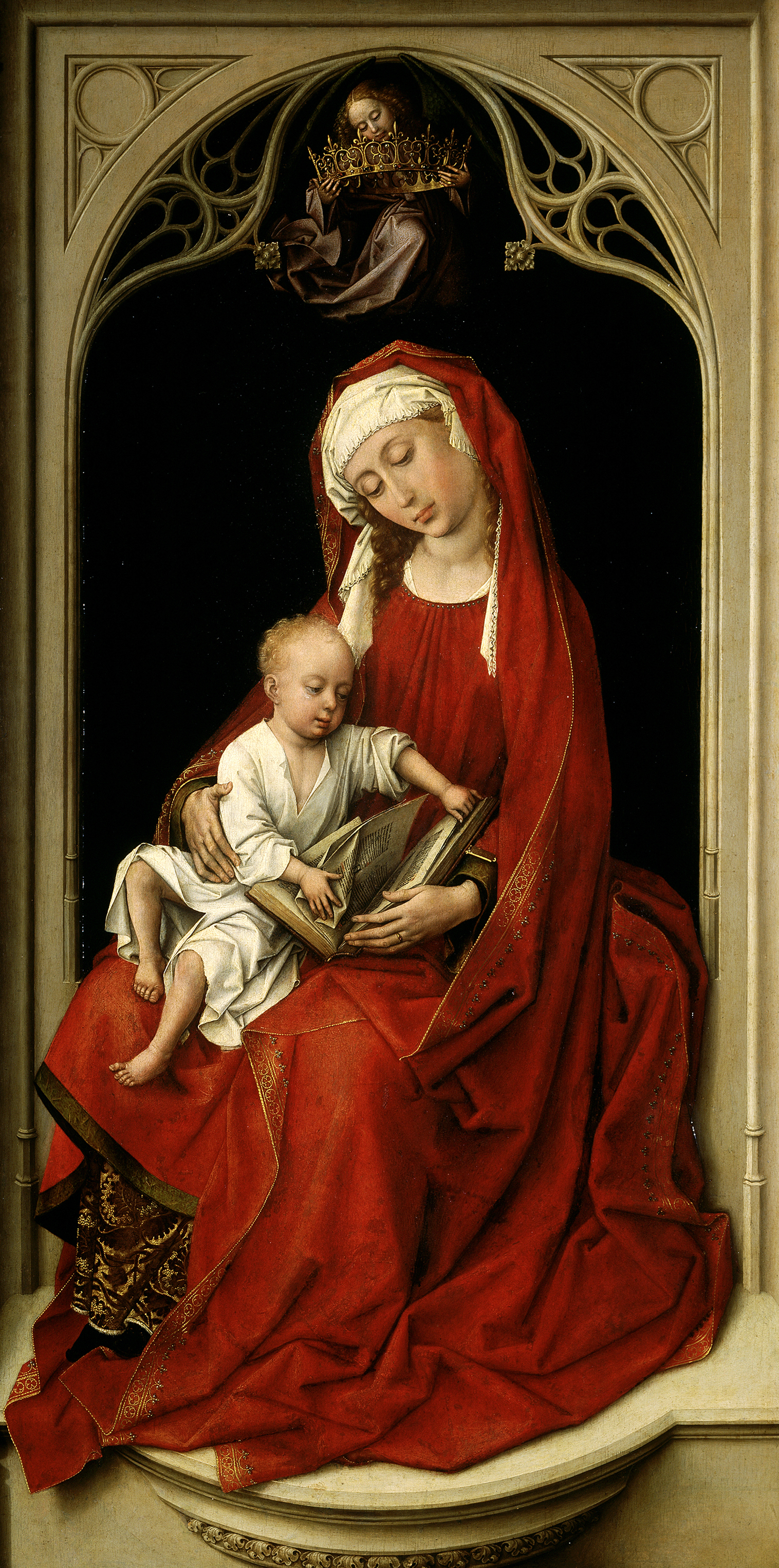
- Artist: Rogier van der Weyden
- Year: c. 1435-38
- Type: Oil on oak wood
- Dimensions: 100 cm × 52 cm (39 in × 20 in)
- Location: Museo del Prado; Madrid

Durán Madonna (also known as the Madonna in Red or Virgin and Child in a Niche or Madonna Enthroned) is an oil on oak panel painting completed sometime between 1435 and 1438 by the Netherlandish painter Rogier van der Weyden. The painting derives from Jan van Eyck's Ince Hall Madonna and was much imitated subsequently. Now in the Prado, Madrid, it depicts a seated and serene Virgin Mary dressed in a long, flowing red robe lined with gold-coloured thread. She cradles the child Jesus who sits on her lap, playfully leafing backwards through a holy book or manuscript on which both figures' gazes rest. But unlike van Eyck's earlier treatment, van der Weyden not only positions his Virgin and Child in a Gothic apse or niche as he had his two earlier madonnas (the Madonna Standing and the Virgin and Child Enthroned), but also places them on a projecting plinth, thus further emphasising their sculptural impression.

Christ appears much older than in most contemporary paintings of this kind. He is shown as a small child, but with none of the softness characteristic of 15th-century depictions of the Virgin and Child. The painting has a sculptural look that van der Weyden often favoured, and is similar in colour to his c. 1435 Descent from the Cross (Madrid) and c. 1442–45 Miraflores Altarpiece (Berlin).

The Durán Madonna was acquired by Pedro Fernández-Durán in 1899 at the Palacio de Boadilla, Madrid. He donated the work to the Museo del Prado in 1930.

== Description ==
Mary is shown in a long, red, hooded robe and white headdress, with the Child Jesus in a white shirt seated on her lap. He curiously leafs through and crumples the pages of a book perched on his mother's knee. The book is placed at the very centre of the panel, symbolising the centrality of the divine Word in Christian belief. According to the Prado, the book itself represents an allusion to the "Holy Scriptures that announce Christ's redemptive mission." An angel in a dark grey dress hovers above Mary's head, holding a pearl-encrusted crown destined for her upon her assumption as Queen of Heaven. Mary's long robe swirls around the pictorial space, obscuring her throne and eventually falling at the support by her feet. They are framed by a sculpted niche or apse with Gothic tracery similar to that found in van der Weyden's Descent from the Cross. The curved arches of the niche echo the lines of her figure as she bends protectively over the child. These curved lines and warm colours give the work its sense of internal harmony.

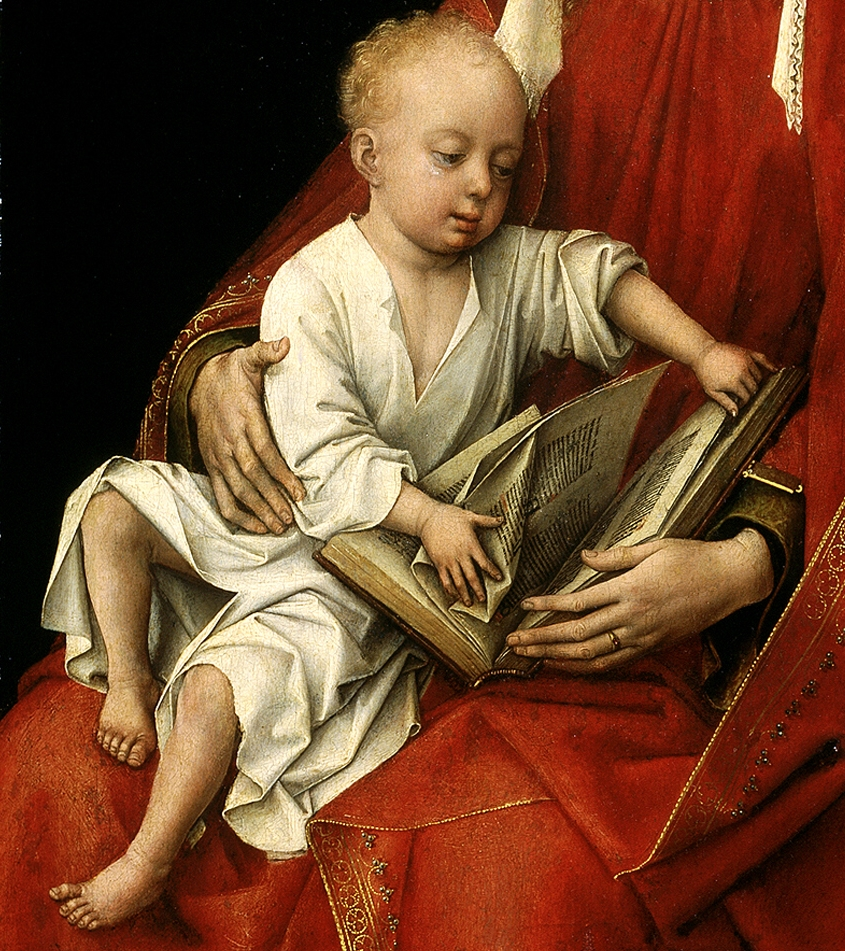
Detail showing a restless child leafing through the parchments of the holy book.

Art-historical analysis in the early to mid-20th century placed little emphasis on Christ's older age for a "Virgin and Child" work of this period. Nor did it emphasise the significance of the manuscript or the rough manner in which Christ seems to leaf through it energetically. More recently, art historians such as Alfred Acres have questioned the significance of the child's freedom of movement and naturalistic portrayal in such a deliberately elegant and poised work—especially in the work of such a self-aware and compositionally involved painter as van der Weyden. Acres believes that the book is central to the understanding of the painting, and notes its perfect centrality in the panel; it is the focus of both figures' gazes and hands, and Christ is apparently leafing backwards through the pages, towards the beginning. While Christ's right hand holds several parchments scrunched together and he pays no attention to them, his more careful left hand is about to open the lower left corner of the open page. If it is reasonably assumed that the book held open on Mary's lap is facing towards her, it seems the child is leafing backwards through the pages. While holy books were often included in 15th-century northern depictions of the Virgin, they were usually associated with the idea of the Virgin as a representation of learning or wisdom; in no other contemporary painting are they turned through with such restless energy, not to mention being turned through from end to beginning. Acres suggests that the infant Christ is leafing back towards Genesis: 3 describing the Fall of Man, citing three other works where van der Weyden similarly articulates the redemptive theme, including the Madonna Standing panel in the Kunsthistorisches Museum where figures of Adam and Eve flank the Madonna.

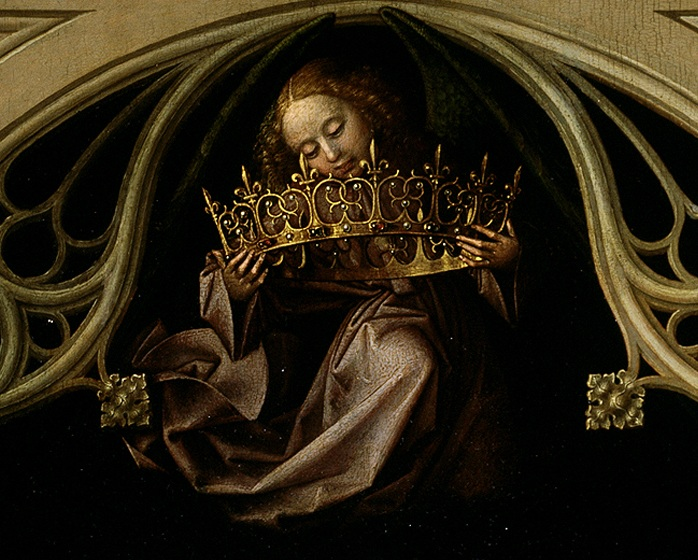
Detail showing the dark winged angel hovering under the Niche holding the crown above Mary's head.

Art historian Lorne Campbell believes the painting was influenced by Robert Campin's Frankfurt Virgin and Child both in the ideal of feminine beauty it presents and for its elegant use of long folded draperies. Campbell notes that both works are composed from strong diagonal lines, with the main figures pushed out into the centre foreground, in an almost trompe-l'œil manner. The Durán Madonna is often compared to van der Weyden's Miraflores Altarpiece, both for the colourisation of Mary's dress and for a sculptural look similar to the reliefs shown in the earlier triptych. In addition, the underdrawing of Mary's head is strikingly similar to that of the kindly, idealised Madonna in his Froimont Diptych (after 1460), now in the Musée des Beaux-Arts, Caen. Because of these strong similarities, attribution to van der Weyden is not doubted. It is known to have been frequently copied in Spain after it was relocated there sometime in the 16th century.

The black overpaint behind the Virgin was probably added at the request of a later 18th-century seller, most likely in an attempt to fashion the piece as a genre work and downplay its religious theme. Research aided by X-ray has been inconclusive and has found no lost detail or drawing beneath the thick layers of paint.

== Illusionary devices ==
Van der Weyden often depicted lifelike and voluminous figures set in shallow sculptural spaces, in which they seemed cramped and larger than scale. The space filled by the figures is undefined and ambiguously located. Mary and the child are supported by a projecting corbel, the three-dimensionality of which gives the disorienting impression that the figures are part of a relief in a much larger work of art. This gives the work a dizzying and dislocated perspective; its own unique sense of space and placement.

The painting is an early example of van der Weyden's habit of rendering his figures with the appearance of polychrome sculptures, an effect here accentuated by the neutral background. Van der Weyden's tendency to blur the line between sculpture and paint in an illusionistic manner can be seen most effectively in his Descent from the Cross. Art historian Robert Nosow notes the architectural aspect of the Gothic frame and the manner in which the lines of the Virgin and child make them seem as if statues come to life. Art historian Shirley Neilsen Blum writes that the faux sculptural elements, "force[s] the viewer to continually confront the seemingly real presence of two media, sculpture and painting ... Rogier defies logic, thereby enhancing the magical quality of the image. Divinity is stressed because it has transcended media definition."

== See also ==
- List of works by Rogier van der Weyden

== Sources ==
- Acres, Alfred. "Rogier van der Weyden's Painted Texts". Artibus et Historiae, Volume 21, No. 41, 2000. 75–109
- Blum, Shirley Neilsen. "Symbolic Invention in the Art of Rogier van der Weyden". Journal of Art History, Volume 46, Issue 1–4, 1977
- Campbell, Lorne; Van der Stock, Jan. (ed.) Rogier van der Weyden: 1400–1464. Master of Passions. Leuven: Davidsfonds, 2009. ISBN 978-90-8526-105-6
- Campbell, Lorne. Van der Weyden. London: Chaucer Press, 2004. ISBN 1-904449-24-7
- Hand, John Oliver; Metzger, Catherine; Spronk, Ron. Prayers and Portraits: Unfolding the Netherlandish Diptych. Yale University Press, 2006. ISBN 0-300-12155-5
- Koch, Robert A. "Copies of Rogier van der Weyden's Madonna in Red". Record of the Art Museum, Princeton University, volume 26, issue 2, 1967. 46–58
- Nosow, Robert. Ritual Meanings in the Fifteenth-Century Motet. Cambridge University Press, 2012. ISBN 0-521-19347-8
- Panofsky, Irwin. Early Netherlandish Painting: volume 1. Westview Press, 1971 (new edition). ISBN 978-0-06-430002-5
