= Jan Van der Stock =

Belgian art historian

Jan Van der Stock (born Antwerp, 1959) is a Belgian art historian and exhibition curator. He is a full professor at the University of Leuven, where he lectures on Medieval and Renaissance Arts, Graphic Arts, Iconography, Iconology, and Curatorship. He is the director of Illuminare – Centre for the Study of Medieval Art (KU Leuven) and holder of the Van der Weyden Chair – Paul & Dora Janssen, the Veronique Vandekerchove Chair of the City of Leuven and the Chair of Medieval Sculpture in the Low Countries. Jan Van der Stock was the husband of Christiane Timmerman and is a father of two.

== Career ==
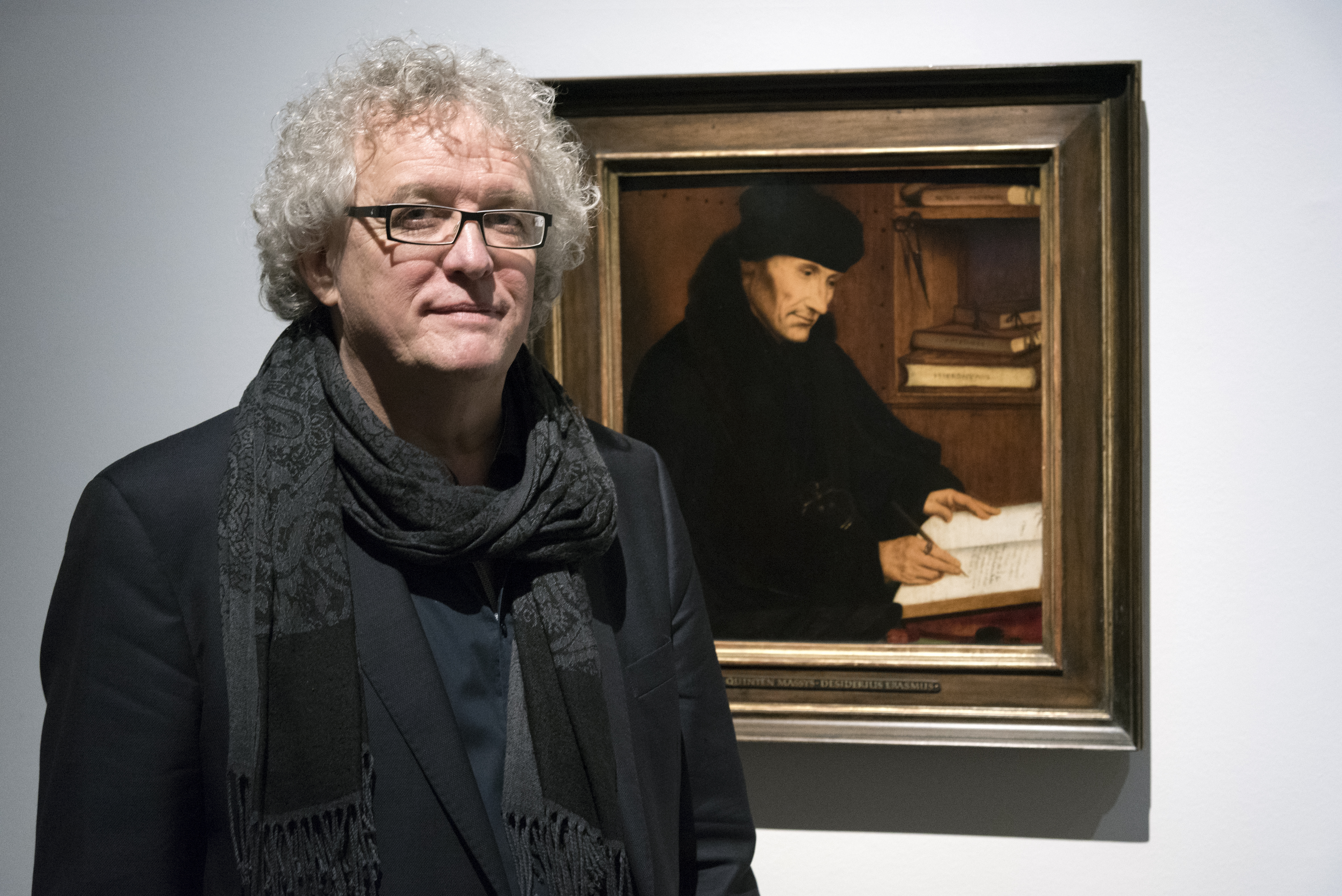
Portrait of Jan Van der Stock, Leuven 2016

In 1995 Van der Stock received his PhD from the KU Leuven with a dissertation on the development of the printed image in the 15th- and 16th-centuries Low Countries. In 1998, based on that dissertation, he published the fundamental book on graphic arts in the Southern Netherlands: Printing Images in Antwerp. The Introduction of Printmaking in a City: Fifteenth Century to 1585. Van der Stock explores the complex way in which the printed image secured a place for itself in the urban fabric. He reconstructs the different traditions from which the print producers evolved, and explains how existing institutions in the city related to the new medium. Very soon afterwards, in April 1999, he was awarded the art-historical Vuurslag Prize by Art & Antiques Fair 's-Hertogenbosch, in recognition of his work. In 1999 he was appointed Bijzonder Hoogleraar of Prints and Drawings at Leiden University. From 1998 to 2000 Van der Stock held the post of assistant curator in the Print Room of the Royal Library of Belgium (Brussels). His foremost undertakings there were the publication of The Print Collection of the Royal Library of Belgium: Early Prints and supervision of the conservation of the complete national collection of fifteenth-century prints. Since 2000 he has been a full-time member of the Faculty of Arts at the KU Leuven. At present he holds the position of full professor. He lectures on Medieval and Renaissance Arts, Graphic Arts, Iconography, Iconology, and Curatorship. Since 2003 he is director of Illuminare – Centre for the Study of Medieval Art (KU Leuven) and holder of the Van der Weyden Chair – Paul & Dora Janssen, the Veronique Vandekerchove Chair of the City of Leuven and the Chair of Medieval Sculpture in the Low Countries. Since 2005 he is member of the Royal Flemish Academy of Belgium for Science and the Arts. Currently he is finishing the book Between Norm and Practice. Two Centuries of Painting and Sculpture in Antwerp. Mid 14th – mid 16th Centuries: Assessing the Archival Evidence.

Jan Van der Stock has organized several international exhibitions in Vienna (1991), Brussels (1985 and 1991), St. Petersburg (1996), Florence (1996), Antwerp (1993 and 1997), Paris (2013) and Leuven (2002, 2009, 2010, 2013 and 2016). In 1993 he was the general coordinator of the seven historical exhibitions that were part of Antwerp 93 – Cultural Capital of Europe. In 2016 he was the initiator and a driving force behind the municipal project 500 Years Utopia - Leuven. Thomas More’s iconic work Utopia was first published in Leuven 500 years ago by the printer Dirk Martens. For three months, the city organized a lavish commemoration of this event with a city festival, a unique social project and a high-profile exhibition. Van der Stock curated the key exhibition in M - Museum Leuven In Search of Utopia. Soon afterwards, he was awarded the Louvain Prize of Cultural Merit in recognition of his commitment and contribution to the cultural field in Leuven. He was/is also involved in numerous other projects centering on art of the Low Countries.

== Selected publications ==
- J. Van der Stock (ed.), In Search of Utopia. Art and Science in the Era of Thomas More (Leuven: Davidsfonds and Amsterdam: University of Amsterdam Press, 2016).
- J. Van Grieken, G. Luijten and J. Van der Stock (eds.), Hieronymus Cock. The Renaissance in Print (New Haven and London: Yale University Press, 2013) (also in Dutch and in French).
- J. Van der Stock, ‘Canon in Context. Consumption of Early-Netherlandish Images in the Fifteenth and the First Half of the Sixteenth Centuries’, in: L. Campbell, J. Van der Stock, C. Reynolds and L. Watteeuw (eds.), Rogier van der Weyden in Context. Papers presented at the Seventeenth Symposium for the Study of Underdrawing and Technology in Painting held in Leuven, 22–24 October 2009 (Paris, Leuven and Walpole, MA: Peeters Publishers, 2012): 3-21.
- L. Campbell and J. Van der Stock (eds.), Rogier van der Weyden. 1400-1464: Master of Passions (Zwolle and Leuven: Waanders and Davidsfonds, 2009) (also in Dutch and in French).
- J. Van der Stock, ‘Prints and Visual Communication in the 16th Century’, in: A Story of The Image. Old & New Masters from Antwerp (Antwerp, Shanghai and Singapore: Museums and Heritage Antwerp, 2009): 182-199.
- J. Van der Stock, ‘Flemish Illuminated Manuscripts: Assessing Archival Evidence’, in: E. Morrison and T. Kren (eds.), Flemish Manuscript Painting in Context. Recent Research. Based on symposia held at the J. Paul Getty Museum, Los Angeles and at the Courtauld Institute of Art, London (Los Angeles: The J. Paul Getty Museum, 2006): 117-122.
- J. Van der Stock, The Print Collection of the Royal Library of Belgium: Early Prints (London: Harvey Miller Publishers, 2002).
- J. Van der Stock, ‘Ambiguous Intentions, Multiple Interpretations: An Other Look at Printed Images from the Sixteenth Century’, in: Netherlands Yearbook for History of Art 52 (2002): 19-30.
- J. Van der Stock, Printing Images in Antwerp. The Introduction of Printmaking in a City: Fifteenth Century to 1585. Studies in Print and Printmaking 2 (Rotterdam: Sound & Vision Interactive, 1998).
- M. Smeyers and J. Van der Stock (eds.), Flemish Illuminated Manuscripts. 1475-1550 (Ghent: Ludion Press, 1996) (also in Dutch, French, Italian and Russian).
- J. Van der Stock (ed.), Antwerp, Story of a Metropolis: 16th-17th Century (Ghent: Snoeck-Ducaju, 1993) (also in Dutch).
- J. Van der Stock (ed.), Stad in Vlaanderen: cultuur en maatschappij 1477-1787 (Brussels: Gemeentekrediet van België, 1991) (also in French and in German).
- J. Van der Stock, ‘The Impact of the Prints of Pieter Bruegel the Elder’, in: D. Freedberg (ed.), The Prints of Pieter Bruegel the Elder (Tokyo: The Tokyo Shimbun, 1989): 89-102 (also in Japanese).
- J. Van der Stock, Cornelis Matsys. 1510/11-1556/57. Grafisch werk (Brussels: Royal Library of Belgium, 1985) (also in French).

== Selected exhibitions ==
- 2016: In Search of Utopia, Museum M, Leuven (curator, together with Annelies Vogels)
- 2013: Hieronymus Cock. The Renaissance in Print, Institut Néerlandais, Paris (curator, together with Ger Luijten and Joris Van Grieken)
- 2013: Hieronymus Cock. The Renaissance in Print, Museum M, Leuven (curator, together with Ger Luijten and Joris Van Grieken)
- 2010: The Bible of Anjou - Naples 1340 - A Royal Manuscript Revealed, Museum M, Leuven (chairman of the organizing committee and curator, together with Lieve Watteeuw)
- 2009: Rogier van der Weyden 1400-1464. Master of Passions, Museum M, Leuven (curator, together with Lorne Campbell and chairman of the organizing committee)
- 2002: Medieval Mastery. Book Illumination from Charlemagne to Charles the Bold (800-1475), Museum M, Leuven (chairman of the organizing committee)
- 1997: Flemish Illuminated Manuscripts 1475-1550, Royal Museum of Fine Arts, Antwerp (curator, together with Maurits Smeyers)
- 1996: Flemish Illuminated Manuscripts 1475-1550, Hermitage Museum, St. Petersburg (curator, together with Maurits Smeyers)
- 1996: Flemish Illuminated Manuscripts 1475-1550, Museo Bardini, Florence (curator, together with Maurits Smeyers)
- 1993: Antwerp Story of a Metropolis, Hessenhuis, Antwerp (curator).
- 1991: Stadtbilder in Flandern: Spuren bürgerlicher Kultur 1477-1787, Renaissanceschloss Schallaburg, Vienna (curator)
- 1991: Stad in Vlaanderen. Cultuur en maatschappij 1477-1787, Galerij van het Gemeentekrediet, Brussels (curator)
- 1985: Cornelis Matsys 1510/11-1556/57.Grafisch werk, Royal Library of Belgium, Brussels (curator)
