= Saint George and the Dragon (van der Weyden) =

Painting by Rogier van der Weyden

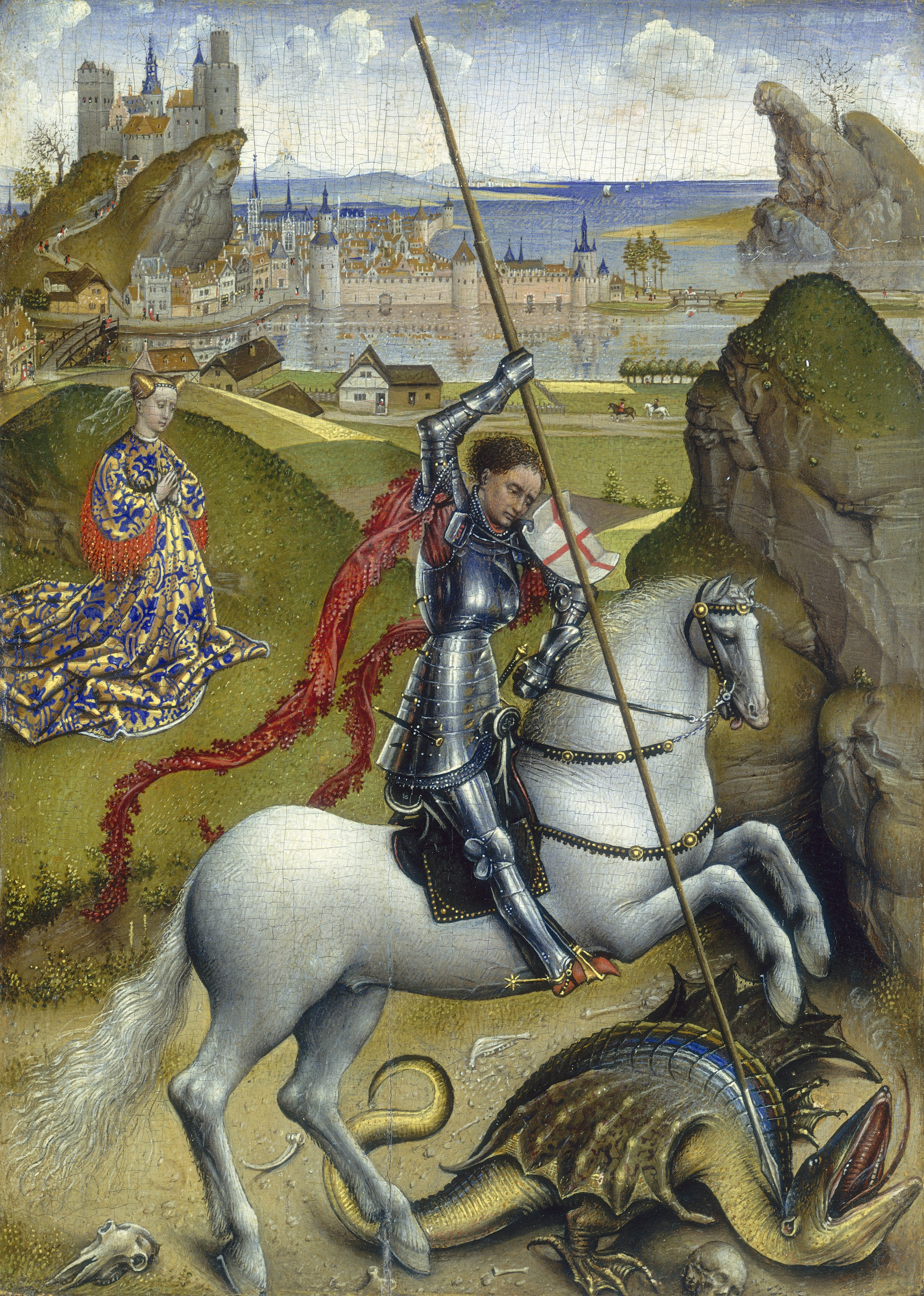
- Artist: Rogier van der Weyden
- Year: c. 1430–1432
- Medium: Oil-on-panel
- Dimensions: 14.3 cm × 10.5 cm (5.6 in × 4.1 in)
- Location: National Gallery of Art, Washington DC

Saint George and the Dragon is a small c. 1432-35 oil-on-wood panel by the Early Netherlandish painter Rogier van der Weyden, held at the National Gallery of Art in Washington DC. It depicts the Christian martyr Saint George impaling a dragon, while Princess Cleodolinda watches and kneels in prayer. The background consists of a contemporary Belgian walled city and castle in the distance. The realism typically found in Early Netherlandish art is blended with elements of fantasy as seen in the fantastical cliff beneath the castle. The use of light and reflections, particularly from Saint George's black armour, indicates Jan van Eyck's influence.

Painted on a small 14.3 by 10.5 centimetres (5.6 in × 4.1 in) panel and set into a slightly larger 15.2 by 11.8 centimetres (6.0 in × 4.6 in) panel, the painting may have been intended as a devotional piece or part of a now-separated diptych. Art historians estimate that it was executed sometime in the early to mid-1430s.

== Description ==
The Legend of Saint George centres on an 11th- or 12th-century tale of a Roman soldier from Cappadocia who slays the dragon and saves the virgin. In one version, the dragon is killed; in another, the dragon is incapacitated, and Princess Cleodolinda, who was to be its sacrifice, ties a girdle around its neck and leads it among the townspeople and eventually to Saint George, who makes the killing blow. According to the art historians Martha Wolff and John Hand, in the van der Weyden painting, "it appears that the dragon is not being killed in one blow, but only pinned to the earth with the lance point."

The piece consists of three wooden boards: the painted surface is on the smallest, which measures 14.3 by 10.5 centimetres (5.6 in × 4.1 in) and is and inset into a slightly larger board (15.2 by 11.8 centimetres (6.0 in × 4.6 in); these two are mounted on a third panel. Infrared reflectogram analysis shows a small crack that extends from the bottom of the panel through the horse's foremost rear hoof and the dragon's tail, to the horse's flank.

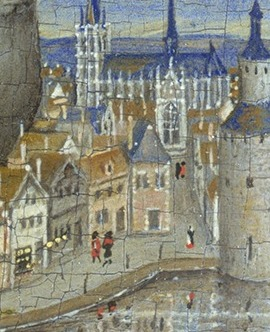
Detail of a street scene in the city background

Saint George is depicted as the manifestation of chivalry, clad in shining black armour, which reflects bright light, as he spears the dragon. Princess Cleodolinda kneels behind to his left, dressed in a lavish gown and headdress, hands clasped. Although Saint George's legend is set in Anatolia, the painting shows a contemporary and realistic, although probably imaginary, Belgian town. A body of water surrounds the buildings and the town walls; above looms an oddly shaped cliff or mountain, the base for a large castle. The town-scene contains tiny details, buildings, people scurrying about and "tiny ships on the horizon". It was painted in successive layers and Hand writes that the "astonishing degree of detail must have required the use of a magnification device". Many of the figures cannot be discerned without magnification.

Infrared technical analysis reveals an underdrawing, probably executed with a pen. The knight and his horse, the dragon, the town walls and spires are all present in the underdrawing. The princess is not and seems to have been an afterthought; she is placed against a hill, which was probably already painted, because there is a thicker layer of paint where her head is positioned against the line of the hill.

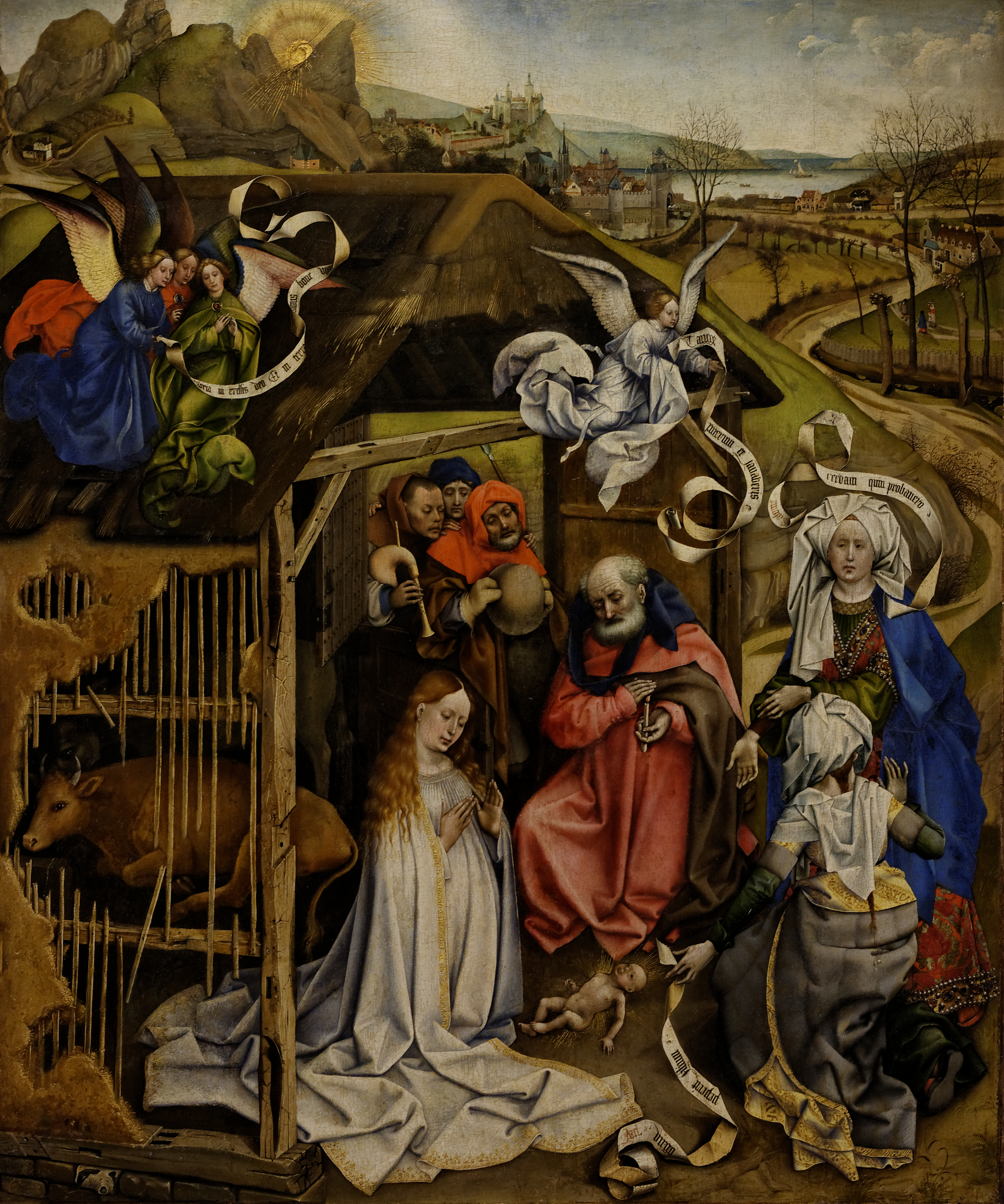
Robert Campin's Nativity has a similar background

Robert Campin's influence can be seen, particularly in the background cliffs, town and water, which occur in his Nativity and van der Weyden seems to have borrowed. The composition takes motifs from International style depictions of Saint George's legend in illuminated manuscripts, such as the Boucicaut Master's version of the legend; and mountains in the Belles Heures. The optical reflections, the dragon, the armour, the water, show van Eyck's influence. Oliver Hand sees similarities in van der Weyden's own Madonna Standing, which he believes was similarly paired with the image of a saint, in this case Saint Catherine. Though the Saint Catherin panel is not definitively attributed to van der Weyden, the background landscapes and townscapes are comparable.

=== Attribution ===
The painting has variously been attributed to both van Eyck brothers, Jan and Hubert; to Campin and to an unknown follower of either Campin or Jan van Eyck. The art historian Hulin de Loo first established van der Weyden's hand, specifying that it probably was executed during his apprenticeship or shortly thereafter; an attribution that is generally accepted. According to John Oliver Hand, Rogier is the most likely author, but he cautions that any attribution should not discount the possibility of a workshop member or follower of either Campin or Rogier.

== Sources ==
- Birkmeyer, Karl. "Notes on the Two Earliest Paintings by Rogier van der Weyden". The Art Bulletin, Volume 44, No. 4, 1962
- Hand, John Oliver; Metzger, Catherine; Spronk, Ron. Prayers and Portraits: Unfolding the Netherlandish Diptych. New Haven, CT: Yale University Press, 2006. ISBN 0-300-12155-5
- Wolff, Martha; Hand, John Oliver. Early Netherlandish painting. Washington: National Gallery of Art, 1987. ISBN 0-521-34016-0
- Van Gelder, J.G. "An early Work by Robert Campin". Oud Holland – Journal for Art of the Low Countries Volume 82, No. 1, 1967. 1-17
