= Christiane Timmerman =

Belgian anthropologist (1959–2019)

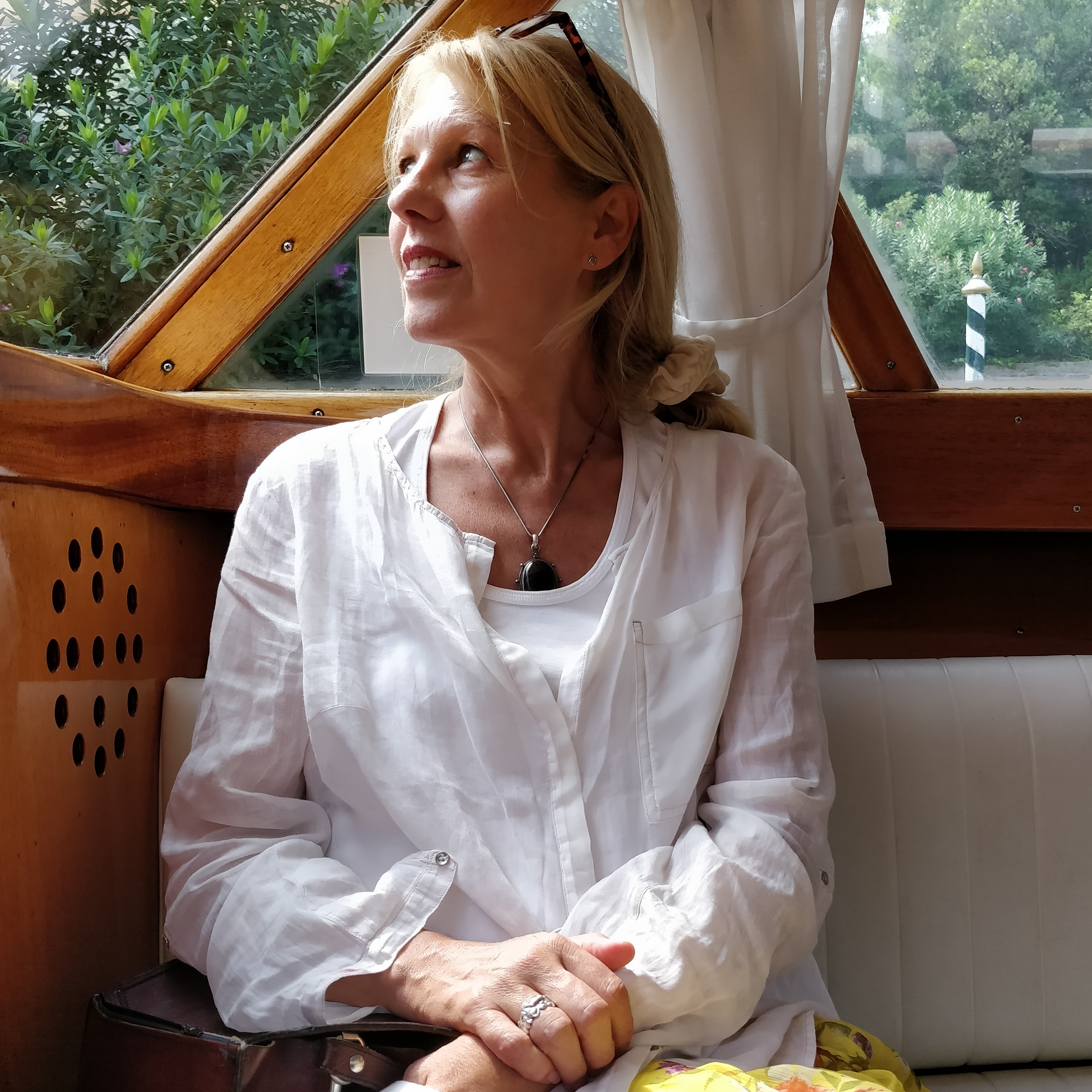
- Born: 20 May 1959; Antwerp
- Died: 10 February 2019 (aged 59)
- Occupations: Psychologist, anthropologist and migration expert

Christiane Timmerman (20 May 1959, Antwerp – 10 February 2019) was a Belgian psychologist, anthropologist and migration expert. In 2006 she became the director of the Centre for Migration and Intercultural Studies (CeMIS), an interdisciplinary research centre at the University of Antwerp that conducts research and education relating to migration, social integration and intercultural themes in various social fields, including education, the labour market, welfare, family, health and law. She was also a professor at the Faculty of Social Sciences at the University of Antwerp where she taught courses related to migration and integration.

== Education ==
Christiane Timmerman studied at the University of Leuven (KU Leuven) where she obtained an M.A. in Psychology (Clinical Psychology and Experimental Social Psychology) (1983) and in Social and Cultural Anthropology (1987). In 1996 she received her PhD in Social and Cultural Anthropology from the KU Leuven.

== Career ==
From 1987 onwards, she was a researcher at the Institute of Tropical Medicine Antwerp, the University of Leuven and the University of Antwerp. From 1997 to 2006 she was coordinator of the research area Migration and Ethnic Minorities in OaSES (University of Antwerp). From 2004 to 2011 she was the academic director of UCSIA, the Saint Ignatius University Centre, Antwerp. She was one of the founders of CeMIS, the research institute where she has worked as director since 2006.

Christian Timmerman died on 10 February 2019.

== Publications ==
Timmerman has published extensively on migration, integration and related topics. Her books. in English include:

- Timmerman, Christiane. New Dynamics in Female Migration and Integration. . New York : Routledge, 2015. ISBN 9780415709040
- Timmerman, Christiane, Maria Lucinda Fonseca, and Lore Van Praag. Gender and Migration: A Gender-Sensitive Approach to Migration Dynamics. 2018. ISBN 9789462701632
- Timmerman, Christiane., ed. Youth in Education: The Necessity of Valuing Ethnocultural Diversity. . London : Routledge, 2018. ISBN 9780815359852
- Timmerman, Christiane, ed. . How to Conquer the Barriers to Intercultural Dialogue: Christianity, Islam and Judaism. Brussels: P.I.E.-Peter Lang, 2007. ISBN 9789052013732
- Timmerman, Christiane, Dirk Rochtus, and Sara Mels., eds. European and Turkish Voices in Favour and against Turkish Accession to the European Union. Bruxelles: P.I.E. Peter Lang, 2008. ISBN 9789052014289
- Timmerman, Christiane, ed. In-between Spaces: Christian and Muslim Minorities in Transition in Europe and the Middle East. Bruxelles: P.I.E. Peter Lang, 2009.USBN 9052015651
