= The Descent from the Cross (van der Weyden) =

Painting by Rogier van der Weyden

- Artist: Rogier van der Weyden
- Year: c. 1435
- Type: Oil on panel
- Dimensions: 220 cm × 262 cm (87 in × 103 in)
- Location: Museo del Prado, Madrid

The Descent from the Cross (or Deposition of Christ, or Descent of Christ from the Cross, or in Flemish Kruisafneming) is a panel painting by the Flemish artist Rogier van der Weyden created c. 1435, now in the Museo del Prado, Madrid. The crucified Christ is lowered from the cross, his lifeless body held by Joseph of Arimathea and Nicodemus.

The c. 1435 date is estimated based on the work's style, and because the artist acquired wealth and renown around this time, most likely from the prestige this masterwork brought him. It was painted early in his career, shortly after he completed his apprenticeship with Robert Campin and shows the older painter's influence, most notable in the hard sculpted surfaces, realistic facial features and vivid primary colours, mostly reds, whites and blues. The work was a self-conscious attempt by van der Weyden to create a masterpiece that would establish an international reputation. Van der Weyden positioned Christ's body in the T-shape of a crossbow to reflect the commission from the Leuven guild of archers (Schutterij) for their chapel Onze-Lieve-Vrouw-van-Ginderbuiten (Notre-Dame-hors-les-Murs).

Art historians have commented that this work was arguably the most influential Netherlandish painting of Christ's crucifixion, and that it was copied and adapted on a large scale in the two centuries after its completion. The emotional impact of the weeping mourners grieving over Christ's body, and the subtle depiction of space in van der Weyden's work have generated extensive critical comments, one of the most famous being, that of Erwin Panofsky: "It may be said that the painted tear, a shining pearl born of the strongest emotion, epitomizes that which Italians most admired in Early Flemish painting: pictorial brilliance and sentiment".

== Description ==
In their accounts of the descent of Christ's body from the Cross, the evangelists relate the story only in connection with the Entombment of Christ. According to the canonical gospels, Joseph of Arimathea took Christ's body and prepared it for burial. John (19:38–42) adds one assistant, Nicodemus. None of these accounts mention Mary. During the Middle Ages, the narrative of the Passion became more elaborate, and more attention was paid to the role of Christ's mother. One example is the anonymous 14th-century text, Meditationes de Vita Christi, perhaps by Ludolph of Saxony. Barbara Lane suggests this passage from the Vita Christi might lie behind many paintings of the Deposition, including Rogier's: "Then the lady reverently receives the hanging right hand and places it against her cheek gazes upon it, and kisses it with heavy tears and sorrowful sighs."

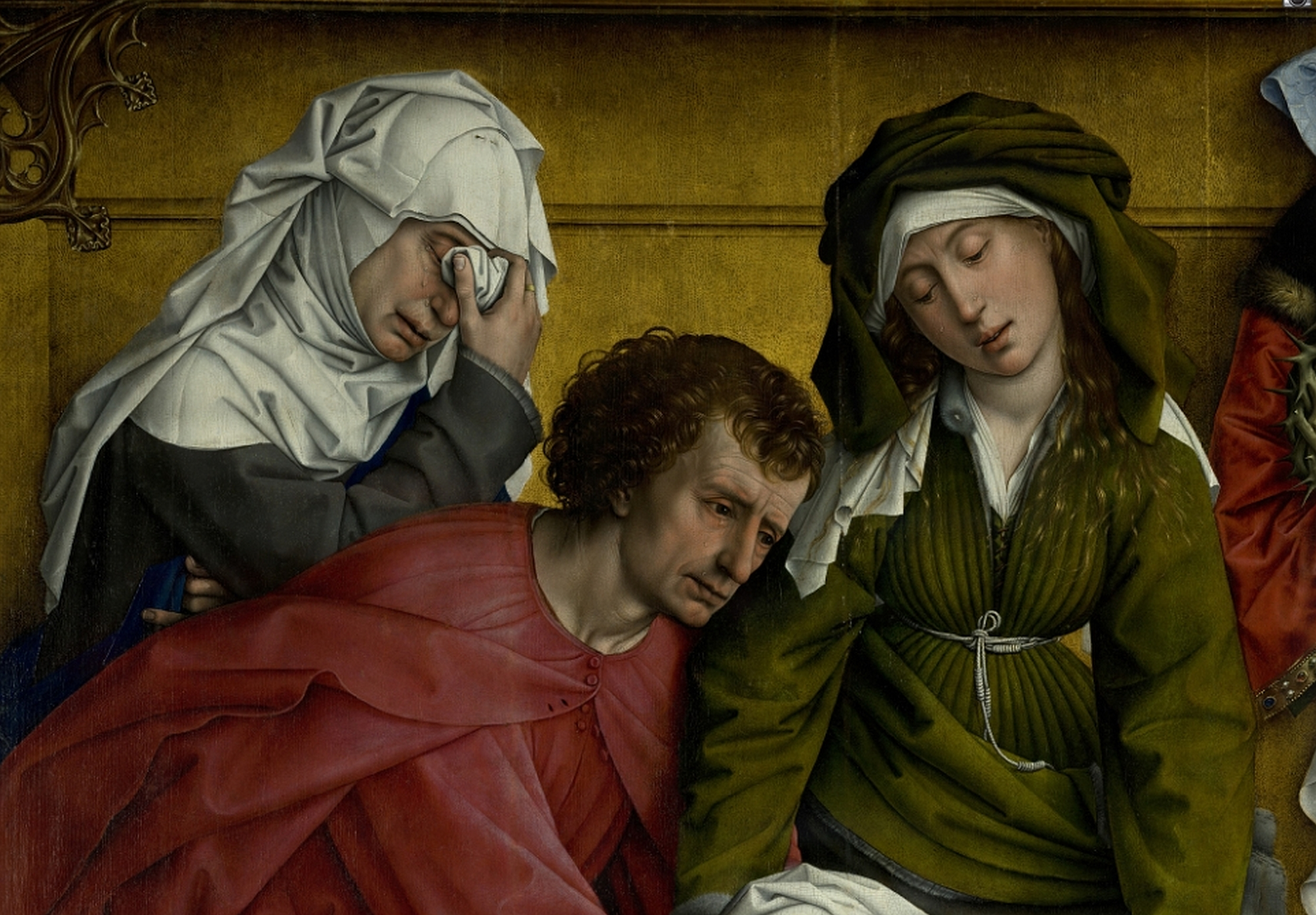
Mary of Clopas, Saint John the Evangelist and Mary Salome (according to Campbell)

In her history of the veneration of the Virgin Mary, Miri Rubin writes that in the early 15th century artists began to depict the "Swoon of the Virgin" or Mary swooning at the foot of the cross or at other moments, and that van der Weyden's Descent was the most influential painting to show this moment. This swooning was described by theologians with the word spasimo. In the early 16th century, such was the popularity of depictions of the swooning Virgin, Pope Julius II was lobbied with a request to designate a holy day as a feast of the spasimo. The request was turned down.

Art historian Lorne Campbell has identified the figures in the painting as (from left to right): Mary Cleophas (half-sister to the Virgin Mary); John the Evangelist, Mary Salome (in green, another half-sister of the Virgin Mary), The Virgin Mary (swooning), the corpse of Jesus Christ, Nicodemus (in red), a young man on the ladder – either a servant of Nicodemus or of Joseph of Arimathea, Joseph of Arimathea (in field-of-cloth-of-gold robes, the most sumptuous costume in the painting), the bearded man behind Joseph holding a jar and probably another servant and Mary Magdalene who adopts a dramatic pose on the right of the painting.

There is disagreement between art historians as to the representation of Joseph of Arimathea and Nicodemus. Dirk de Vos identifies Joseph of Arimathea as the man in red supporting Christ's body, and Nicodemus as the man supporting Christ's legs, the opposite of Campbell's identification.

== Sources and style ==
The work is unique in the period because of Mary's swoon; her collapse echoes the pose of her son, as far as to the two figures that hold her as she falls. This pose was entirely new for Early Netherlandish art. The sentiment, however, is a direct reflection of the mystical devotion expressed by Thomas à Kempis' popular treatise The Imitation of Christ, first published in 1418. The text, just as the image here, invites the reader or viewer to personally identify with the suffering of Christ and Mary. The doctrines of Denis the Carthusian also emphasized the significance of the Virgin Mary and her belief in Christ at the moment of his death. Denis expresses the conviction that the Virgin Mary was near death when Christ gave up his spirit; Van der Weyden's painting powerfully conveys this idea.

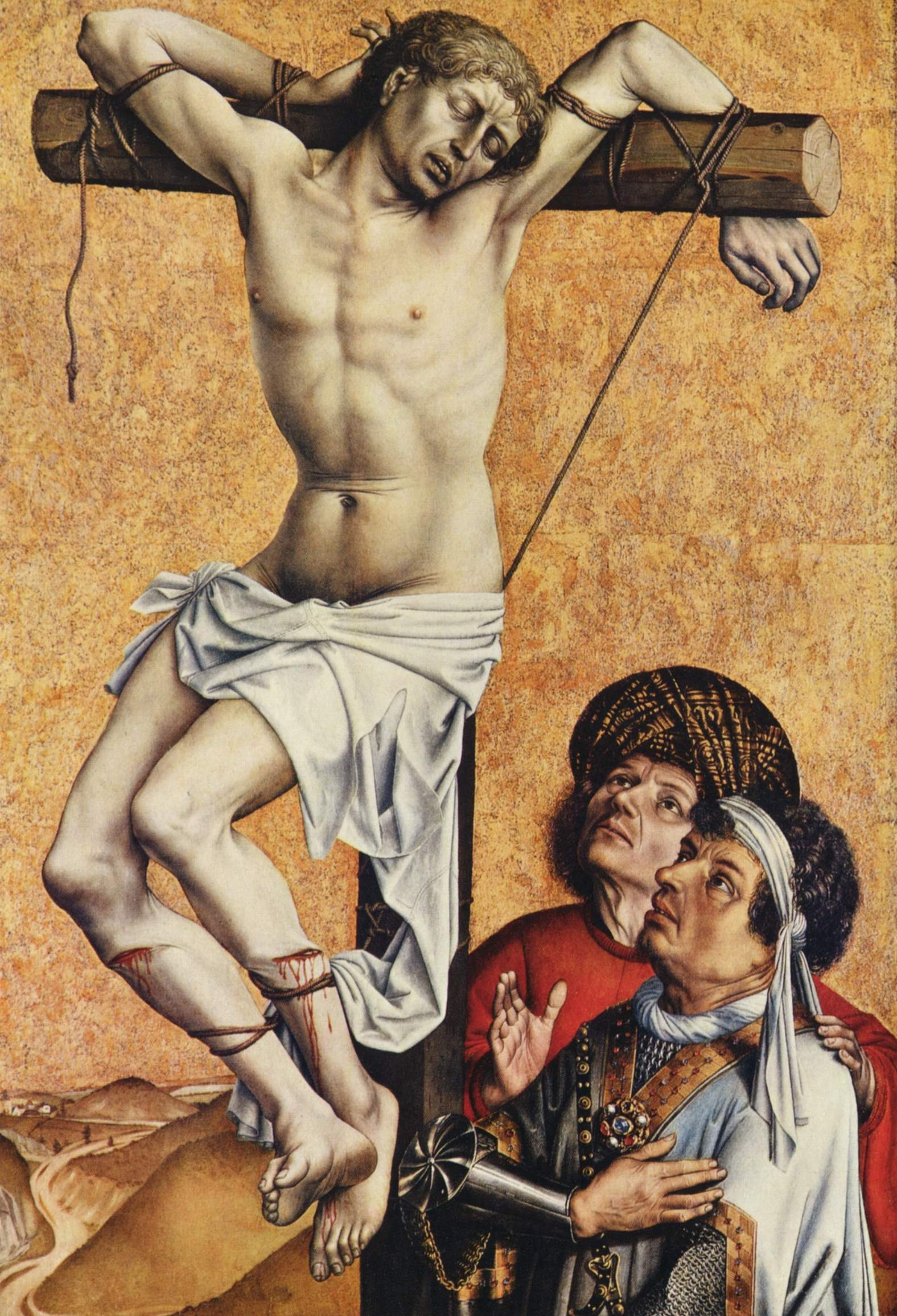
The Crucified Thief, Robert Campin, c. 1420–1440. Campin's sculptural style so influenced van der Weyden that at one stage art historians thought they might have been the same person.

The shape of the crossbow can be seen in the bent and contorted outline and curve of Christ's body and arched back, which seems to reflect the patronage of the Greater Guild of Crossbowmen. Powell argues that in medieval theology, a common metaphor compared the form of Christ on the cross to a taut crossbow: "[this] bow consists of a piece of wood or horn and a string, which represents our Saviour. The string can represent his most holy body, which was miraculously strained and stretched in the suffering of his Passion." The fourteenth-century poet Heinrich von Neustadt wrote: "He was laid out on the cross:/There were his pure limbs/and his arms drawn/Like the string of a bow." In Rogier's Deposition, Christ's removal from the cross is pictured as the relaxation of a bow that has released its arrow.

De Vos suggests that van der Weyden wished to evoke a life-sized, carved relief filled with polychrome figures and thus elevate his painting to the level of grand-scale sculpture. The work's corners are filled with carved gilded tracery, with the presentation of living figures on a stage intended as a tableau vivant, or sculptural group, the latter of which is created through the sense of condensed movement within a single instant. Mary faints and is supported by St John who rushes to her assistance. The man on the ladder lowers Christ's body, which is already reinforced by Joseph of Arimathea and Nicodemus, both of whom seem to want to carry it to the right of the pictorial space. Nicodemus's movement transforms the weeping Magdalene into a statue frozen in time. De Vos writes: "Time seems to have solidified into a composition. And what a composition. Interplay of undulating lines, swaying poses and counterposes of figures have rightly been compared to technique of counterpoint in polyphonic music."

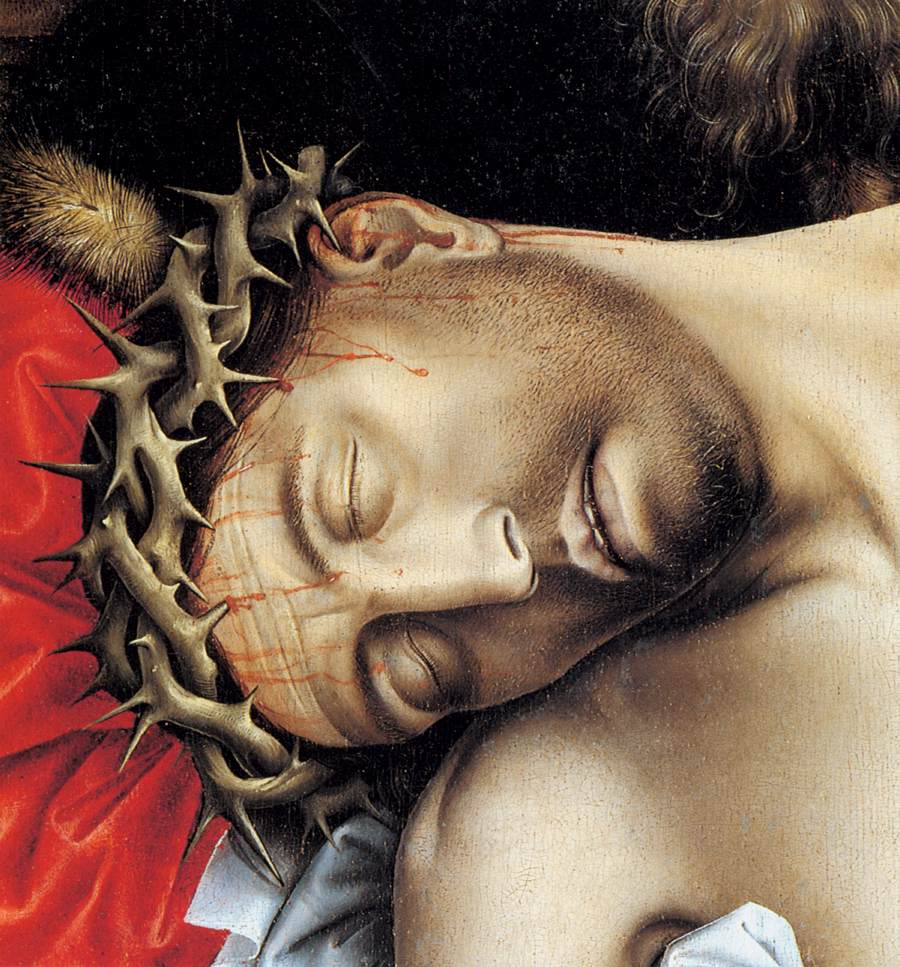
Head of Jesus

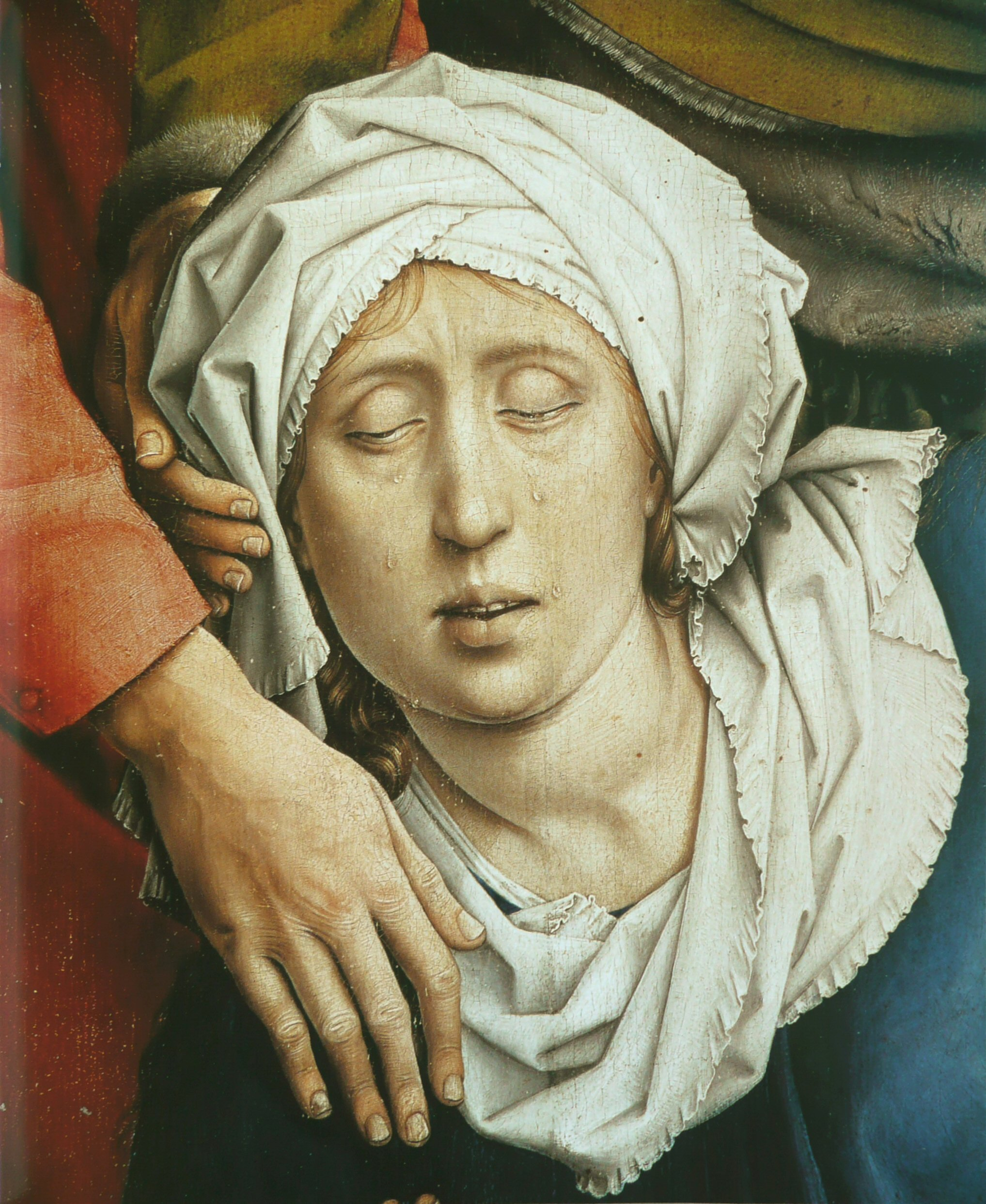
Mary, mother of Jesus

The image can be read as a petrified synthesis of all the stages during and after the Descent from the Cross: the lowering of the corpse, the Deposition, Lamentation and the Entombment. Christ's feet appear to be still nailed together, while the spread of His arms retains the position of His body on the Cross. Christ's body is shown as if held out for the concentrated gaze of the viewer. Joseph of Arimathea looks across the body towards the skull of Adam. Joseph appears as a sumptuously dressed burgher and has the most portrait-like appearance of the figures in the painting; his gaze links the hands of Christ and his mother, the new Adam and Eve, with the skull of Adam. Thereby visualising the essence of the Redemption.

De Vos also analyses the spatial complexity of the painting. The action takes place in a space barely a shoulder-width deep, yet there are no fewer than five levels of depth within the painting: the Virgin Mary at the front, the body of Christ, the bearded figure of Joseph of Arimathea, the cross and the assistant on his ladder. At the "back" of the painting, the assistant breaks the spatial illusion, by allowing one of the two nails he holds to protrude in front of the painted niche. Campbell argues that the key to the work is not naturalism in the detail of the painting, but rather the use of distortion to induce a sense of unease in the viewer. By including completely irrational details and by distorting otherwise extremely faithful images of reality, the artist shocks us into reconsidering our attitudes to his subjects. Campbell suggests that, in certain aspects, Rogier has more in common with Matisse or the Picasso of Guernica than with his contemporaries.

An example of the play with the illusion of space can be seen in the young man at the top of the ladder holding the nails withdrawn from Christ's body. Campbell points out that this servant behind the cross appears to have caught his sleeve in the wooden tracery depicted at the top of the painting. The head of one of the bloody nails that he holds is in front of the fictional wooden picture frame, though the point of the other nail is behind the tracery. Campbell argues that, in order to prevent these spatial distortions from becoming too obvious, Rogier took pains to conceal the principal pictorial junctions in the picture. For example, the ladder is in an impossible perspective: its top is behind the cross while its foot appears to be in front of the cross. To conceal the points at which the Cross and the ladder meet the landscape, Rogier has greatly lengthened the Virgin's left leg, so that her left foot and mantle cover the base of the Cross and one upright of the ladder.

== Provenance ==
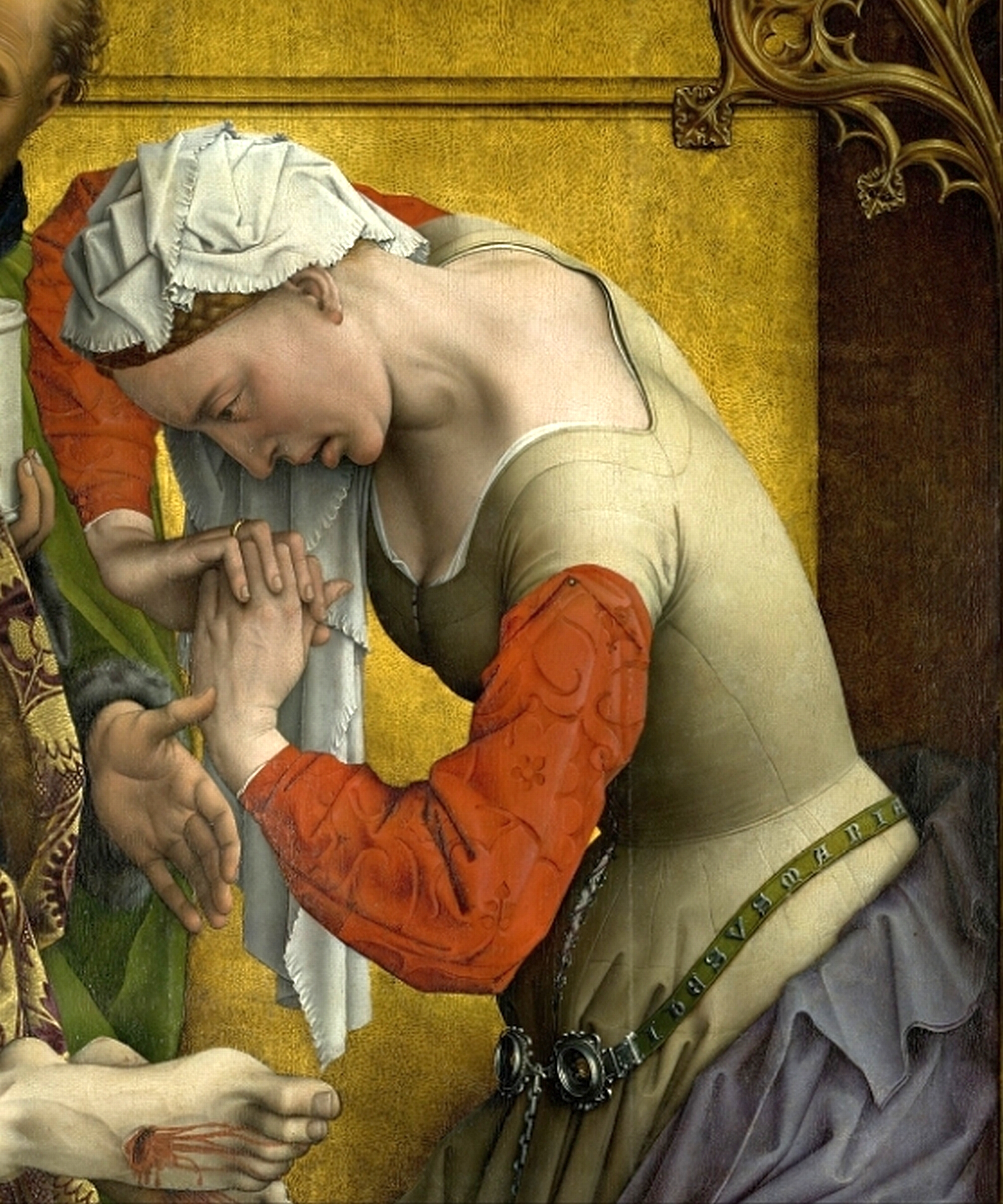
Mary Magdalene

The painting was commissioned by the Greater Guild of Crossbowmen of Leuven and installed in the Chapel of Our Lady Without the Walls. The tiny crossbows in the side spandrels of the picture reflect the original patronage. De Vos and Campbell both give an approximate date of 1435 for the painting. De Vos argues that the earliest known copy of Van der Weyden's Deposition, the Edeleheere triptych in Leuwen, may have been completed by 1435, certainly before 1443. This implies that Van der Weyden's painting pre-dates it. The painting was exchanged around 1548 for a copy by Michael Coxcie and an organ. The new owner was Mary of Austria, sister of Holy Roman Emperor, Charles V, for whom she governed the Habsburg Netherlands. The painting was initially installed in Mary's castle at Binche, where it was seen by a Spanish courtier, Vicente Alvárez, who in 1551 wrote "It was the best picture in the whole castle and even, I believe, in the whole world, for I have seen in these parts many good paintings but none that equalled this in truth to nature or devoutness. All those who have seen it were of the same opinion."

Alvárez had accompanied the future king of Spain, Philip II on his tour of his possessions in the Netherlands. After inheriting the Descent from his aunt Mary in 1558, Philip transported the painting to Spain, where it was installed in his hunting lodge, El Pardo. On 15 April 1574, the painting was recorded in the inventory of the monastery palace which Philip had founded, San Lorenzo de El Escorial: "A large panel on which is painted the deposition from the cross, with our Lady and eight other figures ... by the hand of Maestre Rogier, which used to belong to the queen Mary".

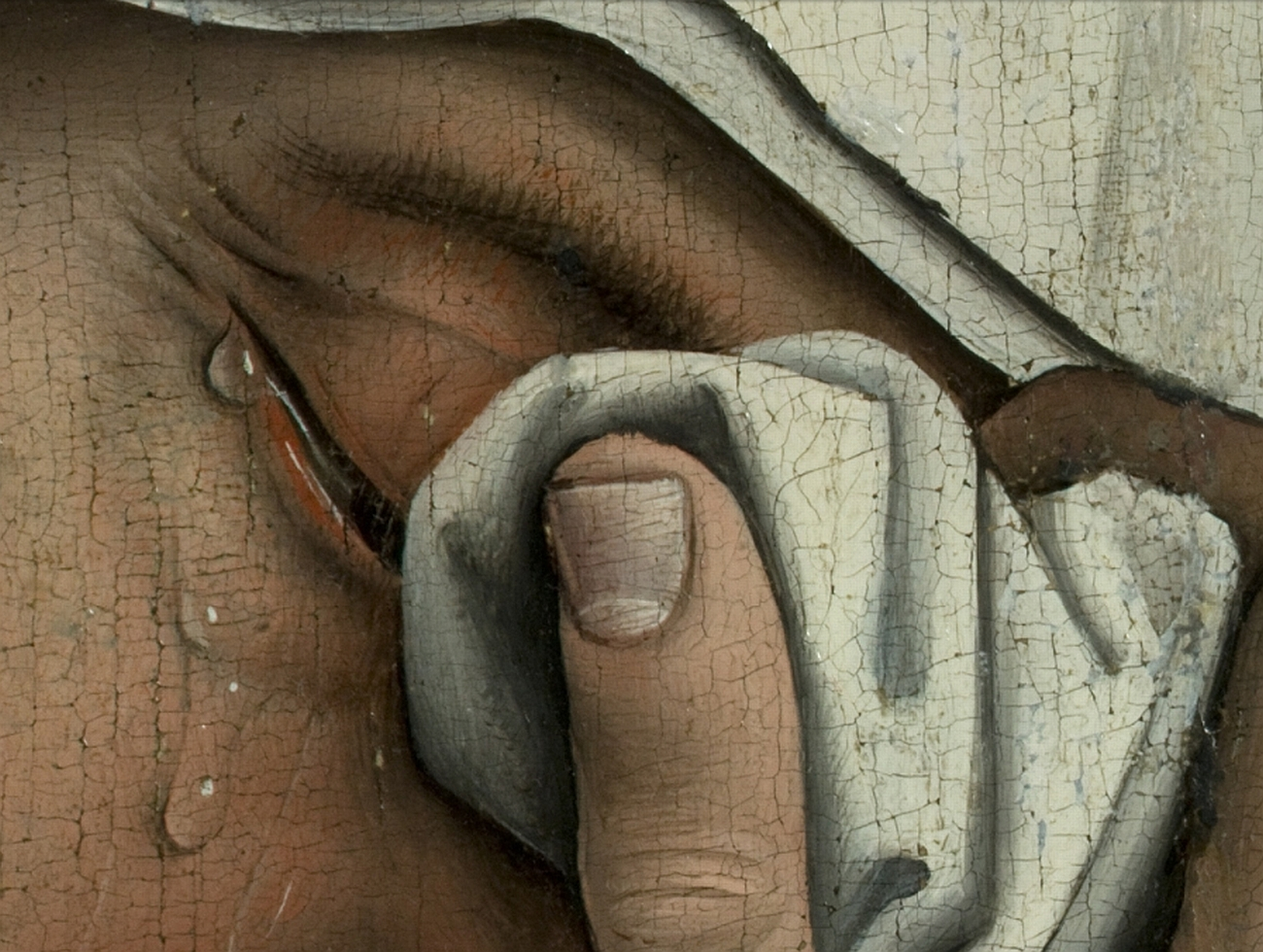
Tears of Mary of Clopas

When Civil War broke out in Spain in 1936, many religious works of art were destroyed. The Spanish Republic took action to protect its artistic masterpieces; The Descent from the Cross was evacuated from El Escorial to Valencia. It was brought to Switzerland by train in the summer of 1939, where the Spanish Republic publicised its plight with an exhibition: "Masterpieces of the Prado", held in the Musée d'Art et d'Histoire in Geneva. That September, the painting returned to the Prado, where it has since remained. By 1992, the Descent was in a state of decay with cracks in the panel threatening to split the painting, and a marked deterioration of the paint surface. A major restoration of the painting was carried out by the Prado, under the supervision of George Bisacca from the Metropolitan Museum of Art, New York.

== Influence ==
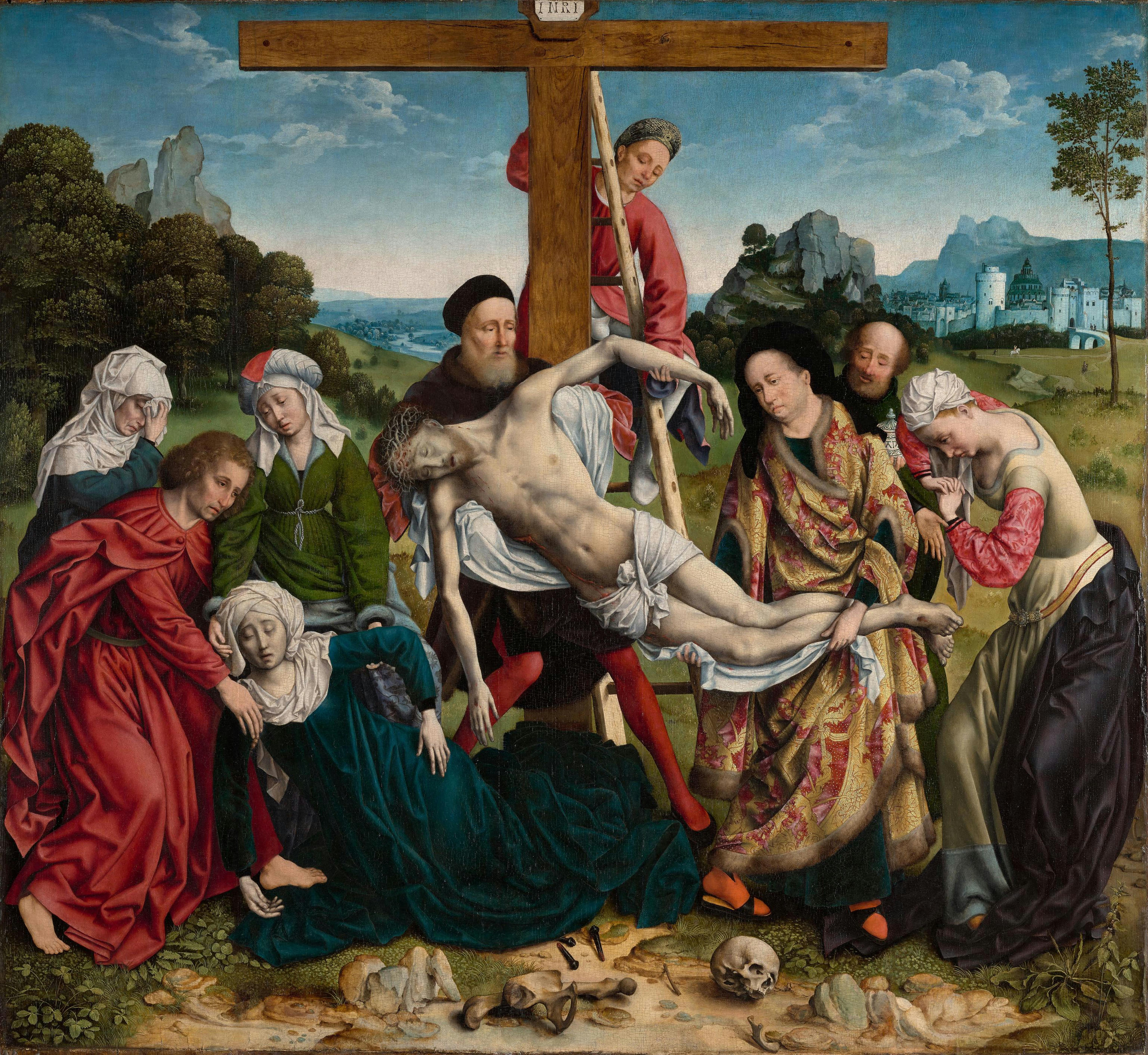
Version by Joos van Cleve, c. 1518-1520, given a landscape background.

The work has been often copied and is extremely influential; within van der Weyden's own lifetime, it was considered an important and unique work of art. In 1565, the Antwerp publisher Hieronymus Cock published an engraving by Cornelis Cort, the first graphic reproduction of Rogier's Descent, which is inscribed with the words "M. Rogerij Belgiae inuentum". Cock's engraving is the earliest record of Rogier's name in association with the Deposition.

In 1953 art historian Otto Von Simson claimed that "no other painting of its school has been copied or adapted so often". In a 2010 episode of the BBC documentary series The Private Life of a Masterpiece which examined the history and influence of The Descent From The Cross, Professor Susie Nash of the Courtauld Institute of Art commented, "It seems that the innovation that van der Weyden made were so striking that other artists throughout Europe, almost could not get away from them. They are quoted again and again and again." Nash concluded, "I think there's a very, very strong case to be made that this is the most important painting of the whole period of the entire 15th century."

In January 2009 Google Earth's collaborative project with the Prado made twelve of its masterpieces, including Descent from the Cross, available at a resolution of 14,000 megapixels, some 1,400 times greater than a picture taken on a standard digital camera.

== See also ==
- List of works by Rogier van der Weyden
