= Madonna Standing (van der Weyden) =

Painting by Rogier van der Weyden

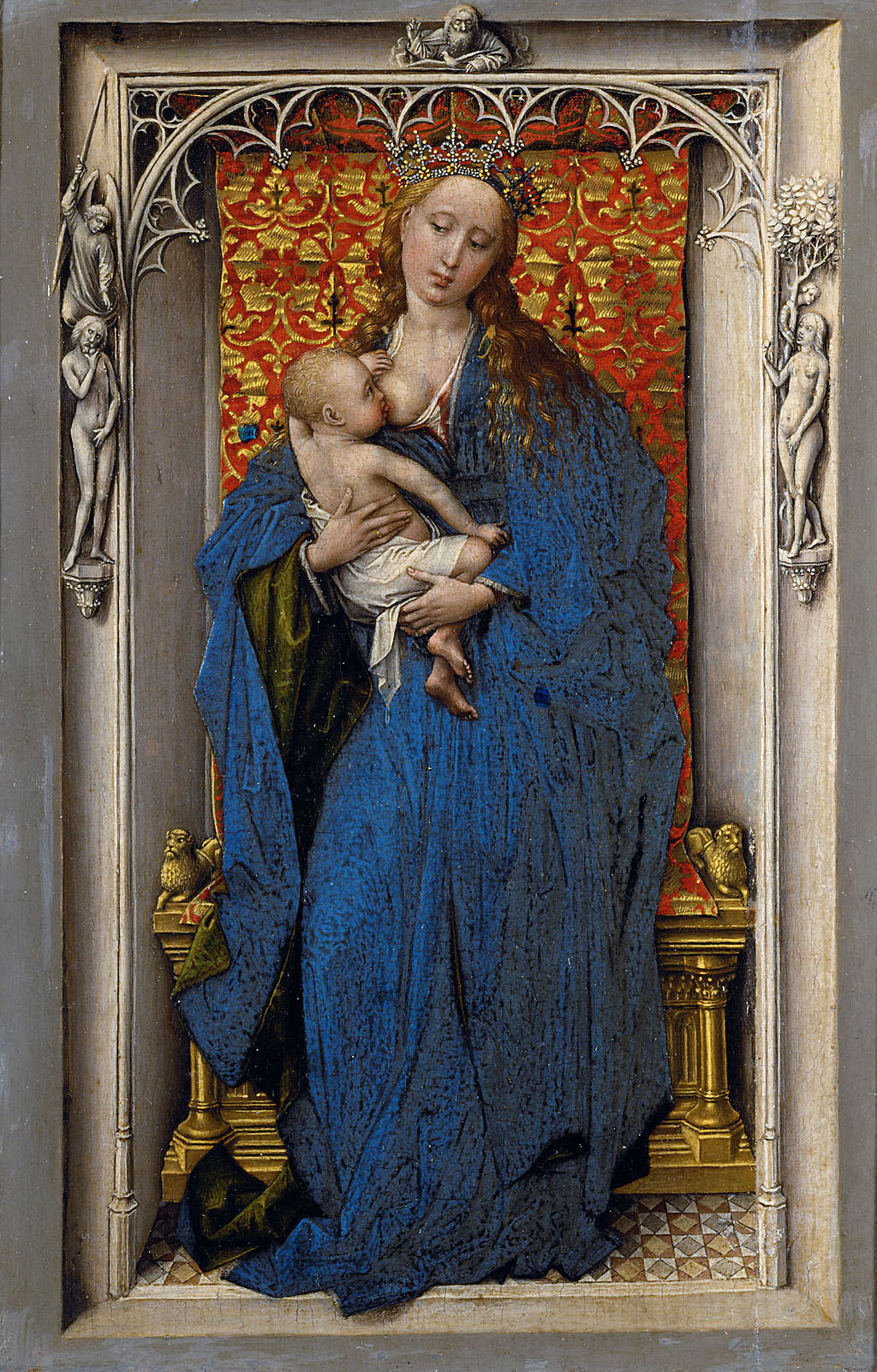
- Artist: Rogier van der Weyden
- Year: Circa 1430–1432
- Type: Oil on oak panel
- Dimensions: 18.8 cm × 12.1 cm (7.4 in × 4.8 in)
- Location: Kunsthistorisches Museum
- Accession: GG_951
- Website: Museum page

The Madonna Standing (or Madonna al latte) is a small painting by the Flemish artist Rogier van der Weyden dating from about 1430–1432. It is the left panel of a diptych held in the Kunsthistorisches Museum (KHM), Vienna since 1772. The right panel portrays St. Catherine and is also attributed by the KHM to van der Weyden, but is inferior in quality and generally regarded as by a workshop member.

The panel shows the Madonna and Child standing in a painted niche. The architecture of the niche's contains biblical and heavenly figures rendered in grisaille, including God the Father, the Holy Spirit represented by a dove, and Adam and Eve. The painting is influenced by Jan van Eyck's Ghent Altarpiece, which the younger artist probably saw after he moved to Ghent around 1432. Borrowings from van Eyck include the positioning of a living figure in a niche, separating Adam and Eve across panels, and placing figure of God leaning on the frame.

== Description ==
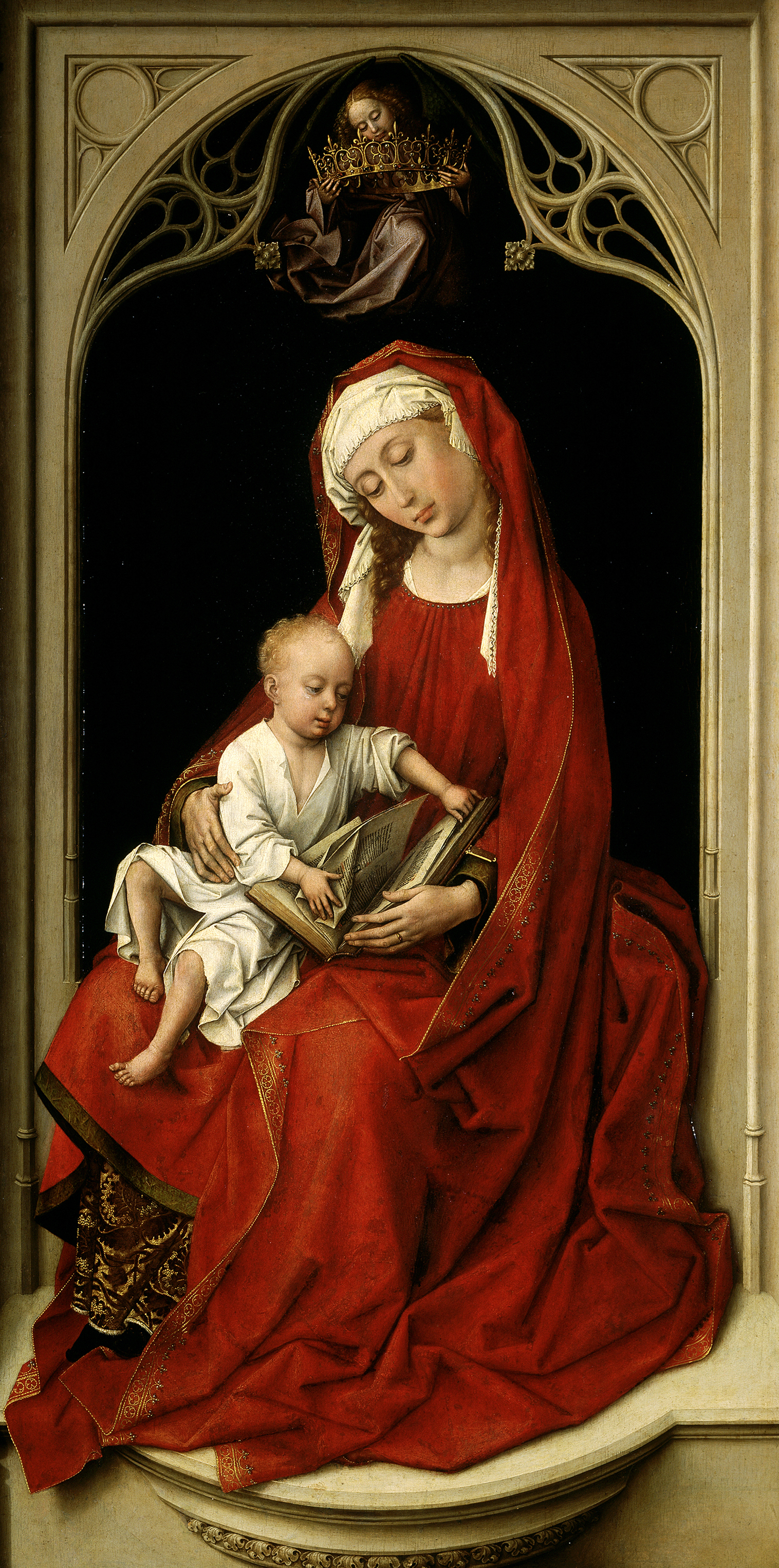
The Durán Madonna, oil on oak wood, circa 1435–1438. Museo del Prado, Madrid.

The painting is a Madonna Lactans. The Madonna and Child stand in a space delimited by the rich brocade of the throne at the back and the delicate curtain of tracery in the front, a flattening of the picture space into a kind of relief regarded by Panofsky as already unmistakably Rogerian. It was a technique he would further refine in his Durán Madonna of 1435–1438. In this work, Mary holds the child in her arms as he suckles at her breast. The blue colour of her robe may allude to her devotion and fidelity to her son. She is wearing a crown, positioning her as Queen of Heaven. The Child is unclothed save for a white linen cloth, foreshadowing the shroud in which his body was later placed following the Deposition.

The niche around the central couple contains a number of biblical figures in grisaille. God the Father is shown at the centre top, just above the niche's concave moulding. He is depicted in frontal foreshortening, giving the impression that He is emerging from the clouds around Him. He seems to lean forward with one hand raised in blessing and the other resting on the frame, the latter a device likely borrowed from the depiction of the prophet Micah in the right lunette on the exterior of the Ghent altarpiece. In both depictions the father is shown directly above Mary, looking down at her and resting on the painting's frame. In the current panel, a dove hovers above Mary, symbolising the Holy Spirit.

To Mary's left and right are the figures of Adam and Eve, referencing the Redemption. Eve stands underneath an apple tree, with a large serpent with a human head coiling its body around its trunk. She eats from the forbidden fruit, indicating that she is depicted at the moment of the fall of man. However Roger avoids providing the work with a narrative element by reversing the typical portrayal of the first couple; Adam is to the left, Eve to the right. Unusually for art to this point, they stand apart, divided on either side of the imitation pictorial frame. Again, this is likely borrowed from the Ghent altarpiece, where the couple are separated by five panels. The lions on the armrests of the chair behind Mary show that she is standing in front of a Throne of Solomon, as is also depicted in Jan Eyck's Lucca Madonna recalling the Seat of Wisdom tradition.

By portraying the ancillary figures in grisaille, Rogier is making a distinction between the earthly, who are rendered as in flesh, and the divine, depicted frozen in time, as imitation sculpture.

== Dating ==
This painting along with the Virgin and Child Enthroned are generally cited as the earliest known works by van der Weyden. Art historian Erwin Panofsky suggested he produced them while still in the workshop of Robert Campin. John Ward of the University of Florida suggests he executed the Madonna Standing after leaving Campin's studio to travel to Ghent where he likely saw Jan van Eyck's newly completed Ghent Altarpiece which is signed and dated May 6, 1432.

Karl Birkmeyer, noting the many borrowing from van Eyck, believes that the panel was completed after Rogier left his apprenticeship. He draws on documentary evidence that the artist did not leave Campin's studio until August 1, 1432, and offers that the technical and compositional skill of the work already indicates the ability and creative freedom of a master craftsman. Birkmeyer goes on to distinguish how the borrowing of motifs are not merely echoes, and that Rogier builds on them and absorbs them into his own expressive language. Many of the motifs he was to return to in more mature works; notably in the heightened abstraction of the Durán Madonna.

== Gallery ==
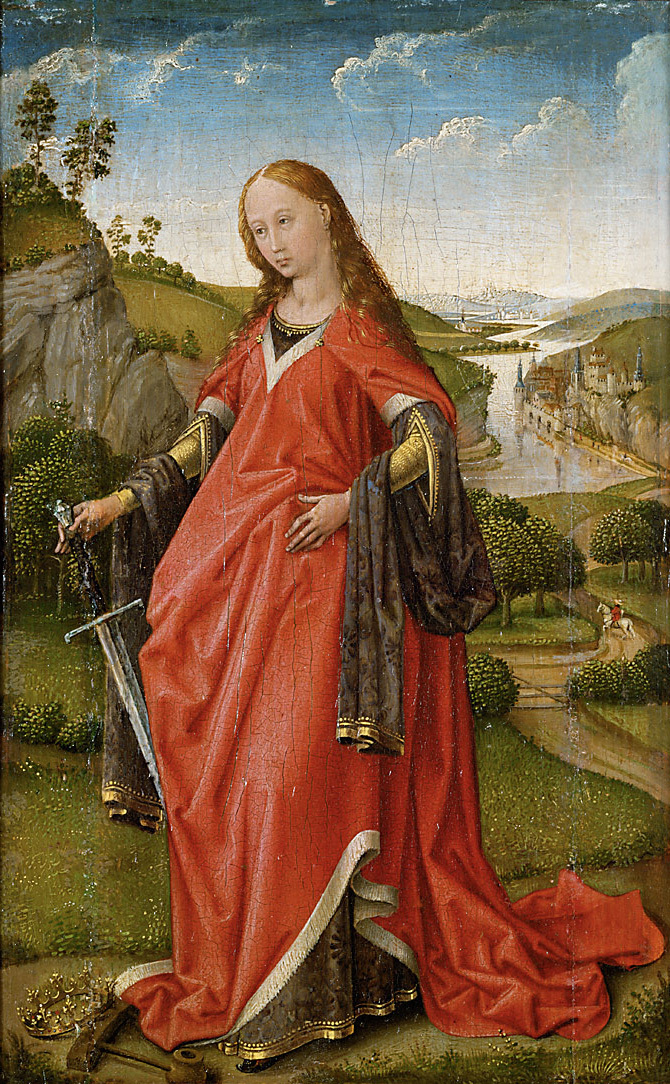
Co-worker of Rogier van der Weyden - St. Catherine, circa 1430–1432, oil on panel (right wing of diptych in Kunsthistorisches Museum, Vienna

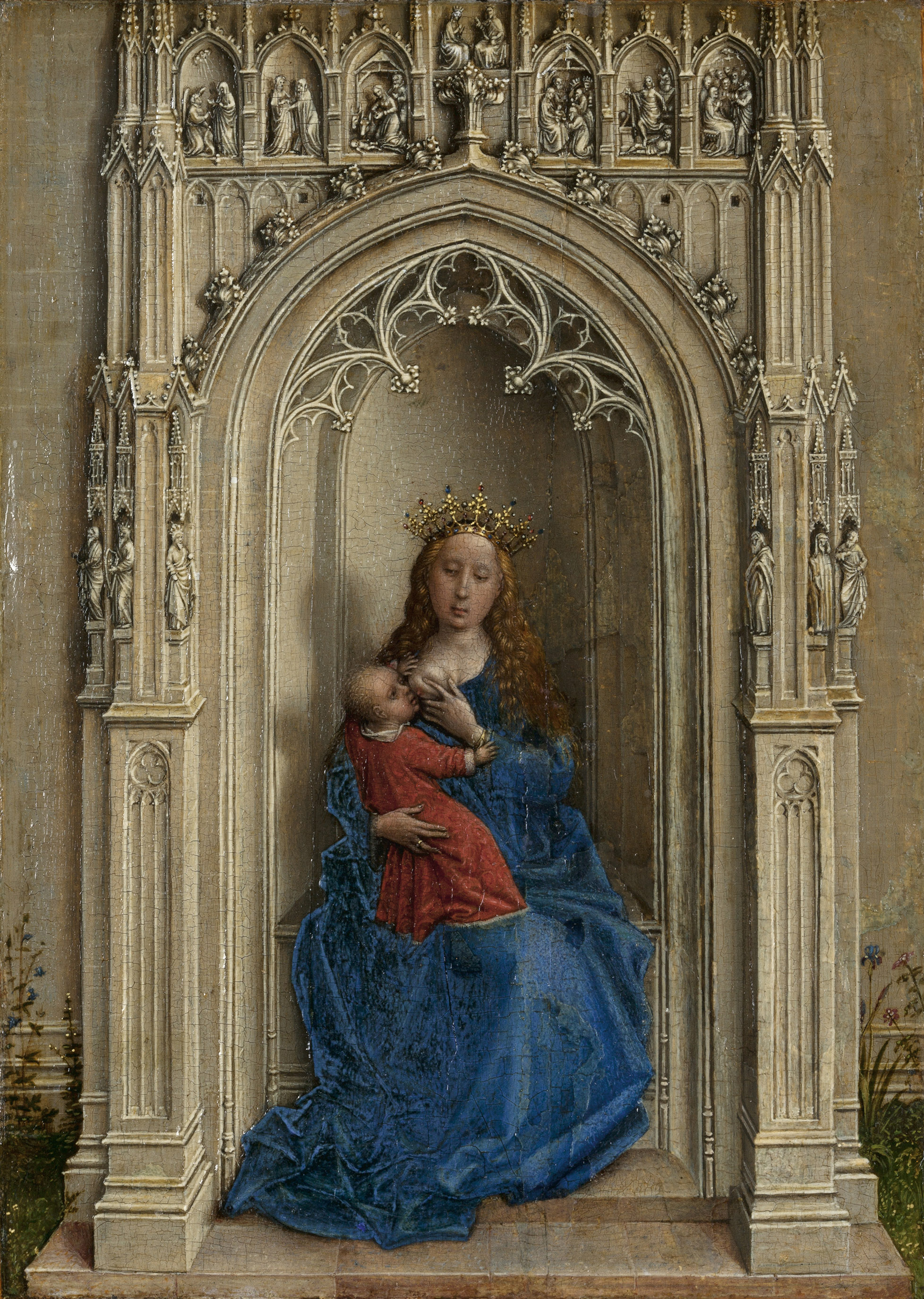
The Virgin and Child Enthroned, oil on panel, circa 1433, Museo Thyssen-Bornemisza.

== See also ==
- List of works by Rogier van der Weyden

== Bibliography ==
- Acres, Alfred. "Rogier van der Weyden's Painted Texts". Artibus et Historiae, Volume 21, No. 41, 2000. 75–109
- Birkmeyer, Karl. "Two Earliest Paintings by Rogier van der Weyden". The Art Bulletin, Volume 44, No. 4, 1962. 329-331
- Panofsky, Irwin. Early Netherlandish Painting: v. 1. Westview Press, 1971 (new edition). ISBN 978-0064300025
- Ward, John L. A New Attribution for the Madonna Enthroned in the Thyssen Bornemisza Collection, The Art Bulletin, Vol. 50, No. 4 (Dec., 1968), pp. 354-356
