= Lorne Campbell (art historian) =

Scottish art historian and curator

Ian Lorne Campbell (born 1946) is a Scottish art historian and curator.

He was Beaumont Senior Research Curator at the National Gallery, London, from 1996 to 2012, and from 1974 to 1996 lectured on the Northern Renaissance at the Courtauld Institute of Art, University of London.

Campbell has curated major exhibitions at the National Gallery and other museums, including ones on Rogier van der Weyden at Leuven in 2009 and the Prado in 2015.

== Biography ==
Campbell was born in Stirling in 1946. He received his undergraduate degree from the University of Edinburgh and Ph.D from University of London in 1973. Between 1970 and 1971 he taught at the University of Manchester and later at the University of Cambridge. In 2016, KU Leuven awarded him an honorary doctorate of the Faculty of Arts.

He is the author of a number of books on fourteenth, fifteenth and sixteenth-century art, and a leading expert on Early Netherlandish painting, and his contributions to research and knowledge on the period are on a par with the works of Max Jakob Friedländer and Erwin Panofsky. His 1998 catalogue The Fifteenth Century Netherlandish Schools has been described as "standard-setting". He has published articles with the journals The Burlington Magazine and The Connoisseur, amongst others.

He lives in London and in 2014 published his book, The Sixteenth Century Netherlandish Paintings with French Paintings before 1600, a catalogue analysing 85 works in the collection of the National Gallery, London. On 20 October 2016 Campbell was awarded an Honorary Doctorate of the Faculty of Arts by the University of Leuven in recognition of his work on fifteenth- and sixteenth-century Netherlandish art.

== Selected publications ==
- The Sixteenth Century Netherlandish Paintings, with French Paintings Before 1600. London: National Gallery, 2014. ISBN 978-1-85709-370-4
- Renaissance Faces: Van Eyck to Titian, (with Miguel Falomir, Jennifer Fletcher, Luke Syson). London: National Gallery, 2011. ISBN 978-1-85709-407-7
- Rogier van der Weyden: 1400–1464. Master of Passions, (with Jan Van der Stock et al.), Leuven: Davidsfonds, 2009. ISBN 978-90-8526-105-6.
- Van Der Weyden. London: Chaucer Press, 2004. ISBN 978-1-904449-24-9
- Art in the Making: Underdrawings in Renaissance Paintings (with Rachel Billinge). London: National Gallery, 2002. ISBN 978-0-300-09225-7
- The Fifteenth Century Netherlandish Schools. London: National Gallery, 1998. ISBN 978-1-857-09171-7
- Renaissance Portraits: European Portrait-Painting in the 14th, 15th and 16th Centuries, Yale University Press, 1990. ISBN 978-0-300-04675-5
- Early Flemish Pictures in the Collection of the Queen (The Pictures in the Collection of Her Majesty the Queen). Cambridge University Press, 1985. ISBN 978-0-521-26523-2
- Van der Weyden. London: Oresko, 1979. ISBN 978-0-905368-54-2
- Hugo van der Goes and the Trinity Panels in Edinburgh (with Colin Thompson). Edinburgh: National Gallery of Scotland, 1974. ISBN 978-0-903148-02-3
