= Rogier van der Weyden =

Early Netherlandish painter (c. 1399 – 1464)

External videos
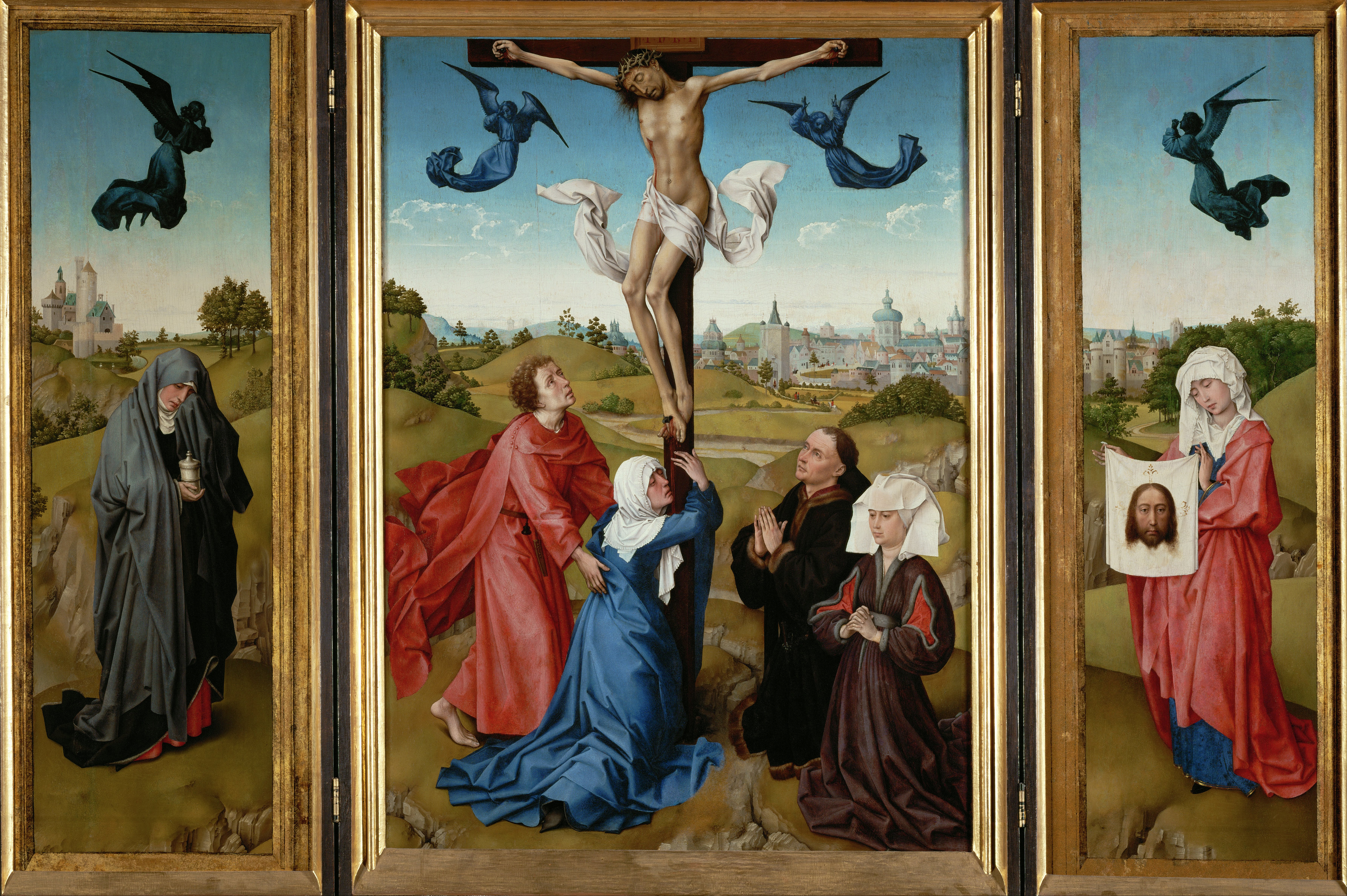
- van der Weyden's Crucifixion Triptych, Smarthistory

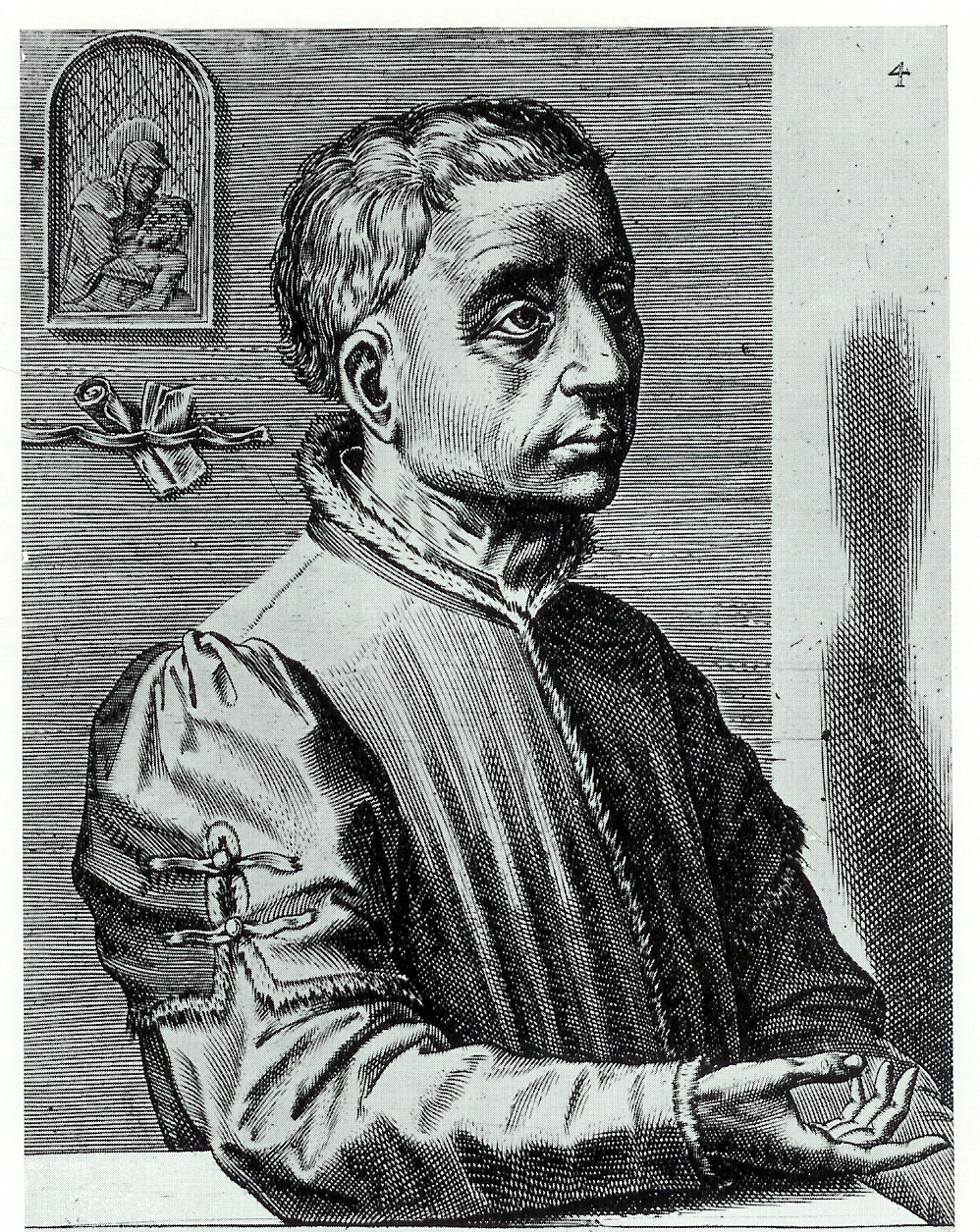
Imaginative portrait by Cornelis Cort, 1572

Rogier van der Weyden (Dutch: [roːˈɣiːr vɑn dər ˈʋɛidə(n)]; 1399 or 1400 – 18 June 1464), initially Roger de la Pasture (French: [ʁɔʒe d(ə) la pastyʁ]), was an early Netherlandish painter whose surviving works consist mainly of religious triptychs, altarpieces, and commissioned single and diptych portraits. He was highly successful in his lifetime; his paintings were exported to Italy and Spain, and he received commissions from, amongst others, Philip the Good, Burgundian nobility, and foreign aristocrats. By the latter half of the 15th century, he had eclipsed Jan van Eyck in popularity. However his fame lasted only until the 17th century, and largely due to changing taste, he was almost totally forgotten by the mid-18th century. His reputation was slowly rebuilt during the 200 years that followed; today he is known, with Robert Campin and Van Eyck, as the third (by birth date) of the three great Early Netherlandish artists (Vlaamse Primitieven or "Flemish Primitives"), and widely as the most influential Northern painter of the 15th century.

Very few details of Van der Weyden's life are known. The few facts we know come from fragmentary civic records. Yet the attribution of paintings now associated to him is widely accepted, partly on the basis of circumstantial evidence, but primarily on the stylistic evidence of a number of paintings by an innovative master.

Van der Weyden worked from life models, and details were closely observed. Yet he often idealised certain elements of his models' facial features, who were typically statuesque, especially in his triptychs. All of his forms are rendered with rich, warm colourisation and a sympathetic expression, while he is known for his expressive pathos and naturalism. His portraits tend to be half length and half profile, and he is as sympathetic here as in his religious triptychs. Van der Weyden used an unusually broad range of colours and varied tones; in his finest work the same tone is not repeated in any other area of the canvas, so even the whites are varied.

== Early life and apprenticeship ==
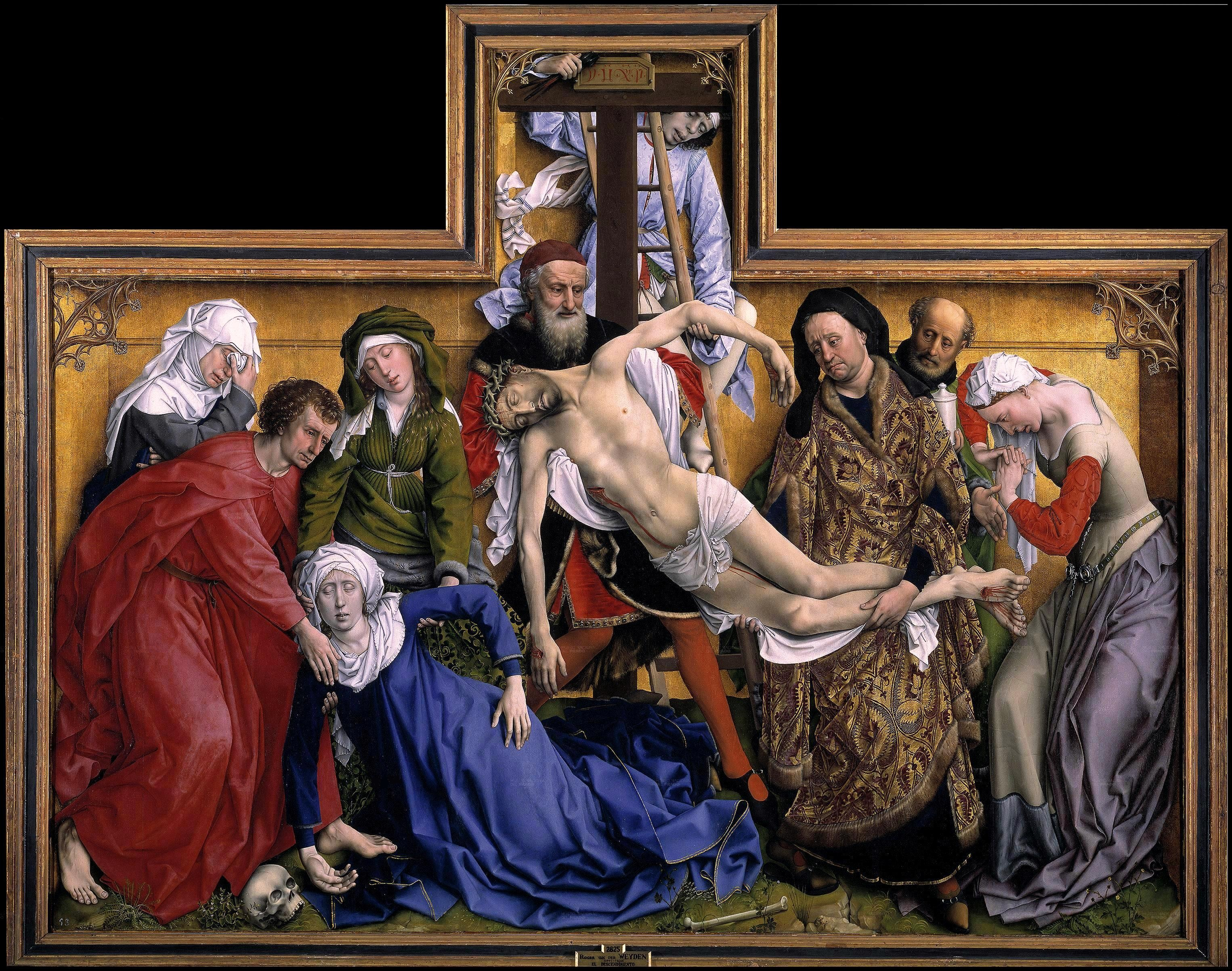
The Descent from the Cross (c. 1435), oil on oak panel, 220 × 262 cm. Museo del Prado, Madrid

Due to the loss of archives in 1695 and again in 1940, there are few certain facts of Van der Weyden's life. Rogelet de le Pasture (Roger of the Pasture) was born in Tournai (then a Bishopric, now part of Belgium) in 1399 or 1400. His parents were Henri de le Pasture and Agnes de Wattrélos. The Pasture family had earlier settled in the city of Tournai where Rogier's father worked as a maître-coutelier (knife manufacturer).

In 1426, Rogier married Elisabeth, the daughter of a Brussels shoemaker, Jan Goffaert and his wife Cathelyne van Stockem. Rogier and Elisabeth had four children, the first being Cornelius (b. 1427), who became a Carthusian monk and Margaretha, born in 1432. By 21 October 1435, the family had settled in Brussels, where the two younger children were born: Pieter in 1437 and Jan in 1438. These latter two would go on to become respectively a painter and a goldsmith. On moving to Brussels, Rogier began using the Flemish version of his name: "Rogier van der Weyden".

From 2 March 1436 onward, Rogier held the title of 'painter to the town of Brussels' (stadsschilder), a prestigious post since Brussels was at that time the most important residence of the court of the Dukes of Burgundy.

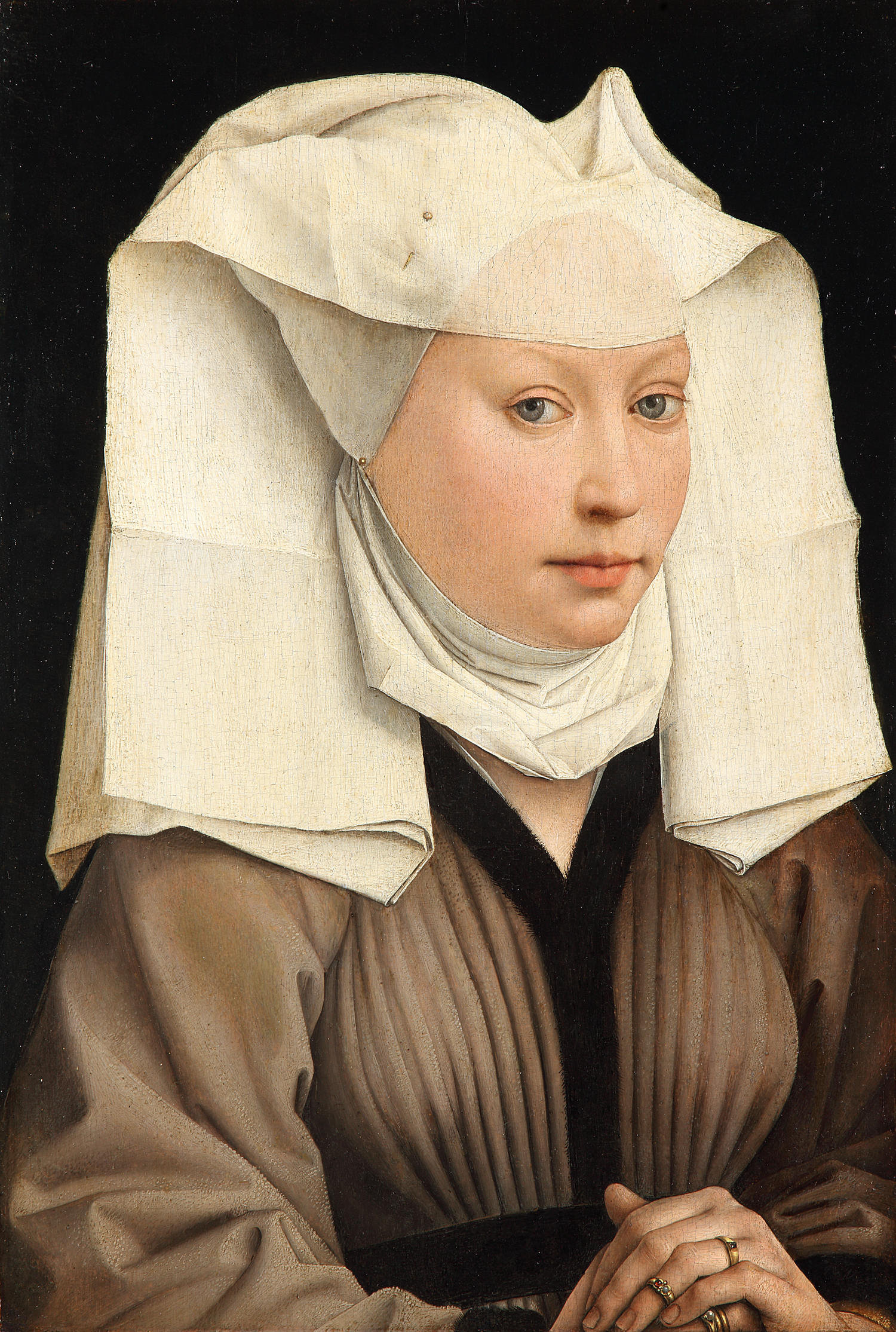
Portrait of a Woman with a Winged Bonnet, c. 1440. Gemäldegalerie, Berlin

Little is known about Rogier's training as a painter. The archival sources from Tournai were completely destroyed during World War II, but had been partly transcribed in the 19th and early 20th century. The sources on his early life are confusing and have led to different interpretations by scholars. It is known that the city council of Tournai offered eight pitchers of wine in honour of a certain 'Maistre Rogier de le Pasture' on 17 November 1426.

However, on 5 March of the following year, the records of the painters' guild show a "Rogelet de le Pasture" entered the workshop of Robert Campin together with Jacques Daret. Records show that de le Pasture was already established as a painter. Only five years later, on the first of August 1432, de le Pasture obtained the title of a "Master" (Maistre) painter.

His later entry into apprenticeship might be explained by the fact that during the 1420s the city of Tournai was in crisis and as a result the guilds were not functioning normally. The late apprenticeship may have been a legal formality. Also Jacques Daret was then in his twenties and had been living and working in Campin's household for at least a decade. It is possible that Rogier obtained an academic title (Master) before he became a painter and that he was awarded the wine of honour on the occasion of his graduation. The sophisticated and learned iconographical and compositional qualities of the paintings attributed to him are sometimes used as an argument in favour of this supposition.

The social and intellectual status of Rogier in his later life surpassed that of a mere craftsman at that time. In general, the close stylistic link between the documented works of Jacques Daret and the paintings attributed to Robert Campin and Van der Weyden are the main arguments to consider Rogier van der Weyden as a pupil of Campin.

== Acclaim in Brussels ==
Braque Triptych, c. 1452. Musée du Louvre, Paris

The final mention of Rogier de la Pasture in the financial records of Tournai, on 21 October 1435, lists him as demeurrant à Brouxielles ("living in Brussels"). At the same time, the first mention of Rogier de Weyden places him as the official painter of Brussels. It is this fact that puts de la Pasture and Van der Weyden as one and the same painter. The post of city painter was created especially for Van der Weyden and was meant to lapse on his death. It was linked to a huge commission to paint four justice scenes for the "Golden Chamber" of Brussels City Hall.

Different properties and investments are documented and witness his material prosperity. The portraits he painted of the Burgundian Dukes, their relatives and courtiers, demonstrate a close relationship with the elite of the Netherlands. While Rogier van der Weyden became increasingly wealthy, he also gave generously in alms to the poor. Further testimony of his philanthropy is Van der Weyden's position as administrator of the hospital and charitable foundation Ter Kisten of the Beguine convent in Brussels between 1455 and 1457. The Miraflores Altarpiece was probably commissioned by King Juan II of Castile, since Juan II donated it to the monastery of Miraflores in 1445.

Beaune Altarpiece, c. 1445–1450. 220 cm × 548 cm (excluding frames). Oil on oak, Hospices de Beaune, interior view

According to some sources, in 1449 Rogier went to Italy, and in the holy year 1450 quite possibly made a pilgrimage to Rome, which brought him in contact with Italian artists and patrons. However, his Italian experiences had no influence on his style. The House of Este and the Medici family commissioned paintings from him. After interventions from both the Duke of Burgundy and the Dauphin of France, the future Louis XI, Rogier van der Weyden was persuaded to accept the request of Bianca Maria Visconti, Duchess of Milan, that her court painter Zanetto Bugatto go to Brussels to become an apprentice in his workshop.

Rogier's international reputation increased progressively. In the 1450s and 1460s humanist scholars such as Nicolas Cusanus, Filarete and Bartolomeo Facio referred to him in superlatives: 'the greatest', 'the most noble' of painters.

Van der Weyden died on 18 June 1464 at Brussels, and was buried in St. Catherine's Chapel of the Cathedral of St. Michael and St. Gudula.

== Attribution ==
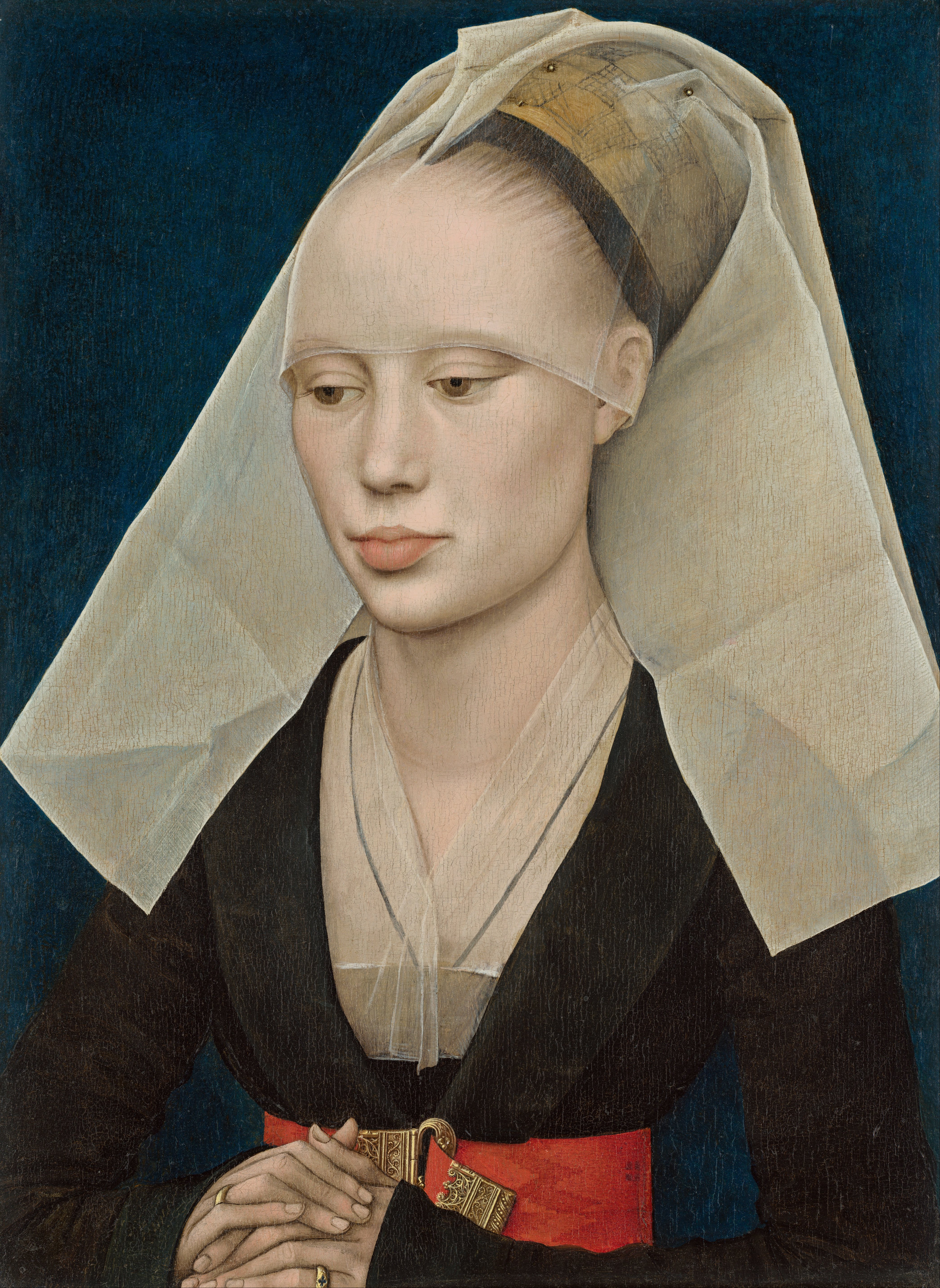
Portrait of a Lady, c. 1460. National Gallery of Art, Washington DC

No single work can be attributed with certainty to Van der Weyden on 15th-century documentary evidence alone. However, Lorne Campbell has stated that three well-authenticated paintings are known, but each has been doubted or underestimated. The best documented is The Descent from the Cross in the Museo del Prado, Madrid. Campbell points out that this painting's provenance can be traced in some detail from the 16th century. Originally hung in the church Notre-Dame-hors-des-Murs in Leuven, The Descent from the Cross was sent to the King of Spain. While the ship on which it was travelling sank, the painting floated, and careful packaging meant that it was scarcely damaged. A copy of the masterpiece by Michel Coxcie was donated to the people of Leuven to replace the original sent to Spain. The Triptych of the Virgin or Miraflores Altarpiece, since 1850 in the Gemäldegalerie, Berlin, was given in 1445 to the Charterhouse of Miraflores near Burgos by John II of Castile; it was described in the deed of gift as the work of great and famous Flandresco Rogel. The Crucifixion, now in the Escorial Palace, was donated by Rogier to the Charterhouse of Scheut outside Brussels. In his catalogue raisonné of Van der Weyden, the Belgian art historian Dirk de Vos agrees with Campbell about the authenticity of these three paintings.

Rogier's apprenticeship under Campin instilled a number of preoccupations, most noticeably his approach to feminine beauty, which was often expressed both through the elegant form of the model herself as well as her dress. Both painters positioned their models within strong diagonal lines, rendered either through headdress or folds of surrounding draperies or cloth. Both emphasised the vivacity of their model's character by contrasting them against dark flat backgrounds and throwing strong light from the near left hand side. Campbell compares Campin's Thief with Rogier's Prado The Descent from the Cross in their emotional depictions of anguish. The resemblance was to such an extent – compare Campin's Portrait of a Woman's similarity to Rogier's Berlin portrait – that Campin's works were for a period attributed to Rogier's early career.

Châtelet illustrates how subsequent generations of art historians have conflated and confused Rogier van der Weyden's identity, thereby mis-attributing works of art. It can be traced back to a geographical error in Vasari's Vite de' più eccellenti pittori, scultori e architettori where he states that the artist 'Rugiero da Brugia' lived in Bruges. Van Mander, who knew that Rogier van der Weyden resided in Brussels, read Vasari's text and believed that there were two different artists with the same name, who both appear separately in his Schilder-boeck of 1604. Châtelet explains how the Brussels archivist Alphonse Walters discovered in 1846 that there was a Rogier van der Weyden who lived in Brussels but that he had died earlier than stated in the Schilder-Boeck; this led Alfred Michiels to claim that there were two Rogier van der Weyden painters, a father and son. A further complication arose at the end of the 19th century when William Bode and Hugo von Tschudi attributed a group of works of art to the "Maître de Flémalle"; despite discrepancies, these works are similar to those of Van der Weyden and so it was believed that these works were in fact by Rogier and that he was the "Maître de Flémalle". It was only in 1913 that Hulin de Loo indicated that these works were actually painted by Rogier's teacher Robert Campin. There was still a divide in critical opinion over whether there was one Rogier van der Weyden or two artists, the other being Rogier de la Pasture of Tournai, until Erwin Panofsky wrote his definitive work in 1953 Early Netherlandish Painting and established that there was only one painter with two names.

== Work ==
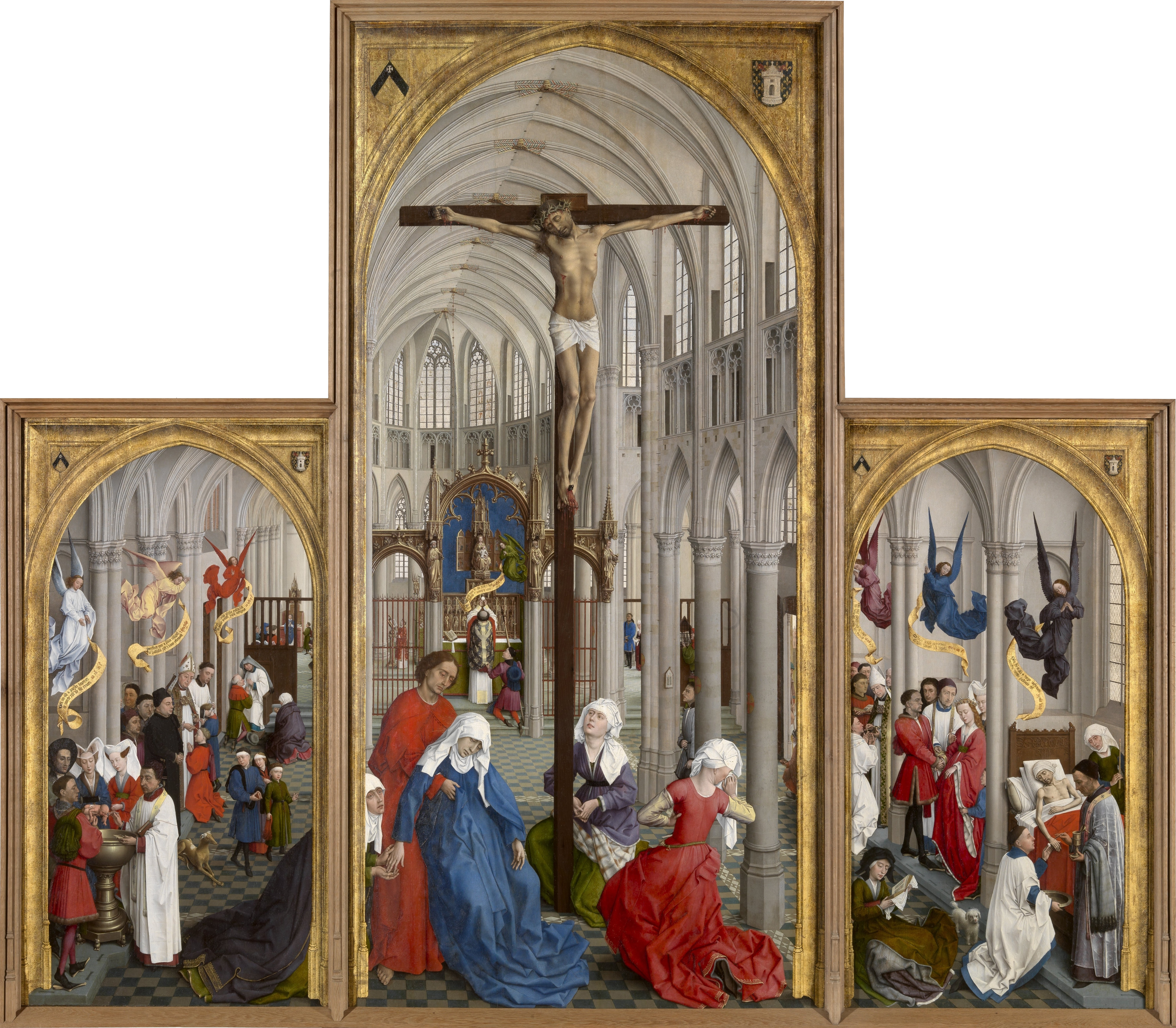
Seven Sacraments Altarpiece, a triptych c. 1445–1450. Royal Museum of Fine Arts, Antwerp

Relatively few works are attributed to Van der Weyden's relatively long career, but this does not mean he was un-prolific, more that it is likely that many have been lost. Nonetheless, he had a very well defined style, and the majority of the attributions are generally accepted. Van der Weyden left no self-portraits. However it has been suggested that he painted a self-portrait into one of the Justice panels, which was subsequently copied into the Bern tapestry. A drawing with the inscription "Recueil d'Arras" is also said to depict Van der Weyden.

Many of his most important works were destroyed during the late 17th century. He is first mentioned in historical records in 1427 when, relatively late in life, he studied painting under Campin during 1427–32, and soon outshone his master and, later, even influenced him. After his apprenticeship, he was made master of the Tournai Guild of St Luke. He moved to Brussels in 1435, where he quickly established his reputation for his technical skill and emotional use of line and colour. He completed his Deposition in 1435, which as he had deliberately intended, made him one of the most sought after and influential artists in northern Europe and is still considered his masterpiece.

The fragment of the London National Gallery's The Magdalen Reading has been described by Campbell as "one of the great masterpieces of fifteenth-century art and among Rogier's most important early works". Since the 1970s, this painting has been linked to two small heads in the collection of the Calouste Gulbenkian Museum (Lisbon), of Saint Catherine and of St Joseph. It is now widely believed that these three fragments came from the same large altarpiece depicting the "Virgin and Child with Saints", partly recorded in a later drawing now in Stockholm. At some unknown date before 1811, this altarpiece was carved up into these three fragments.

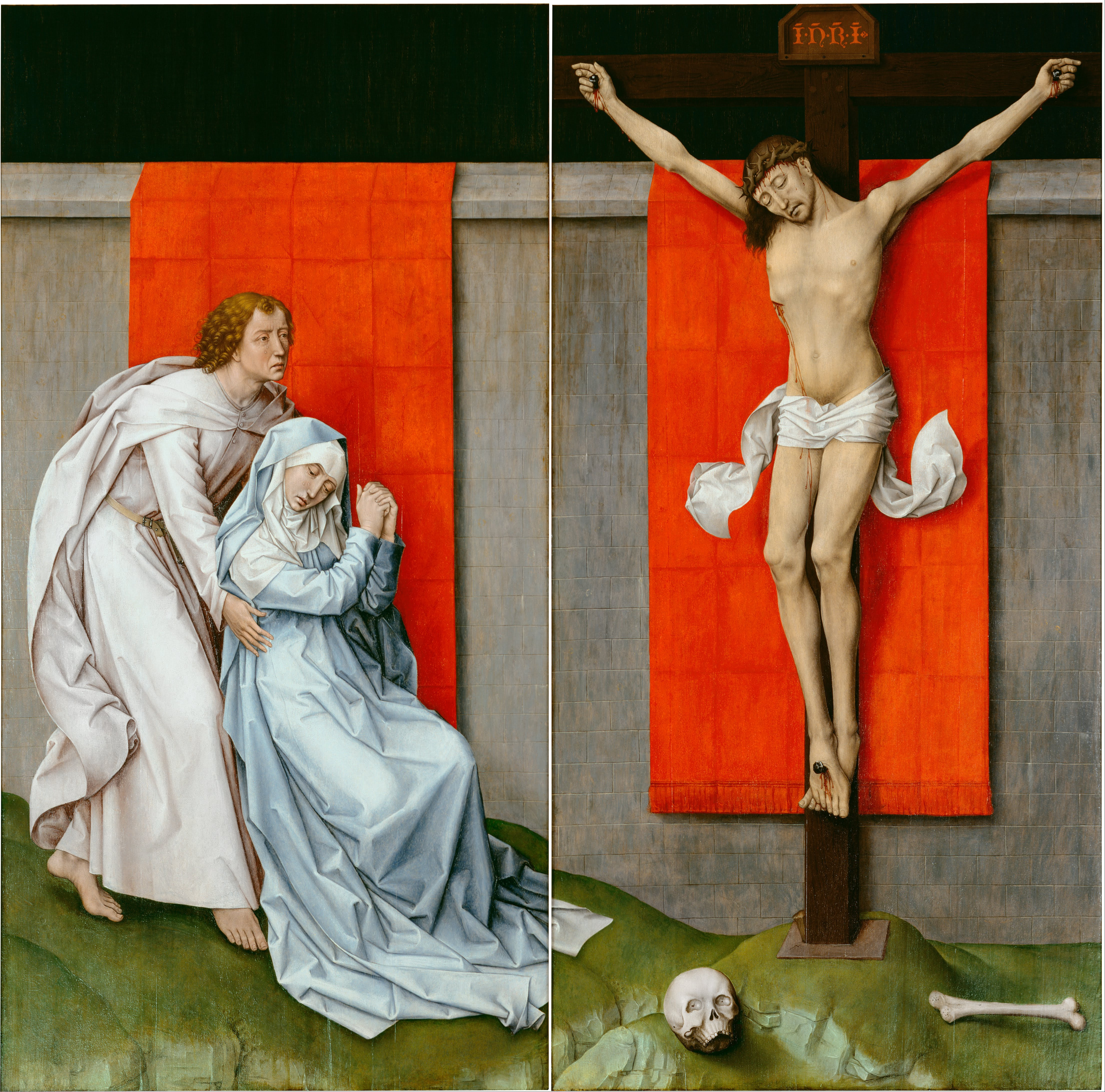
Crucifixion Diptych, c. 1460. Philadelphia Museum of Art

The lost work, The Justice of Trajan and Herkinbald, which survived until the end of the 17th century, consisted of four large panels representing the Justice of Trajan and Justice of Herkenbald. These were commissioned by the City of Brussels for the Gulden Camere (Golden Chamber) of the Brussels Town Hall. The first and third panels were signed, and the first dated 1439. All four were finished before 1450. They were destroyed in the French Bombardment of Brussels in 1695, but are known from many surviving descriptions, from a free partial copy in tapestry (Bern Historical Museum) and from other free and partial copies in drawing and painting. The paintings probably measured about 4.5 m each, which was an enormous scale for a painting on panel at that time. They served as 'examples of justice' for the aldermen of the city who had to speak justice in this room. The paintings were praised or described by a series of commentators until their destruction, including Dürer (1520), Vasari (1568), Molanus (c. 1570–1580), and Baldinucci (1688).

In his commissioned portraits, Van der Weyden typically flattered his sitters. He often idealised or softened their facial features, allowing them a handsomeness or beauty, or interest or intelligence they might not have been blessed with in life. He often enlarged the eyes, better defined the contours of the face, and gave a much stronger jaw than the subject may have possessed in life. Among his most celebrated portraits are those of Philip the Good, his third wife Isabella of Portugal and their son Charles the Bold.

== Influence ==
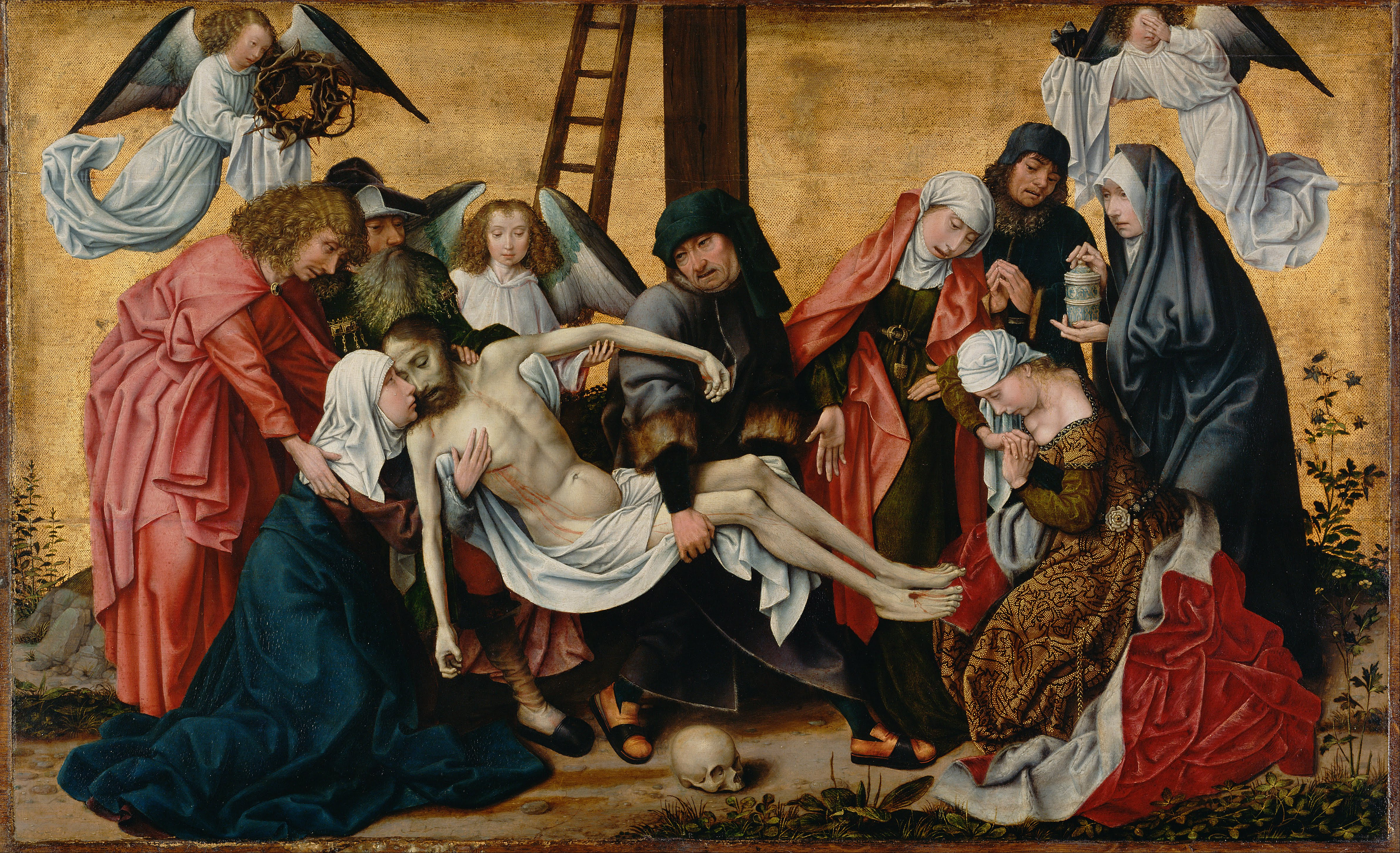
Deposition – Follower of Rogier van der Weyden

His vigorous, subtle, expressive painting and popular religious conceptions had considerable influence on European painting, not only in France and Germany but also in Italy and in Spain. Panofsky writes how Rogier van der Weyden introduced new religious iconography in his painting; he depicted patrons participating in sacred events and combined half-portraits of the Madonna with portraits of people in prayer to form diptychs. He also reformulated and popularised the subject of Saint Jerome removing the thorn from the lion's paw.

Hans Memling was his greatest follower, although it is not proven that he studied under Rogier. Van der Weyden had also a large influence on the German painter and engraver Martin Schongauer whose prints were distributed all over Europe from the last decades of the 15th century. Indirectly Schongauer's prints helped to disseminate Van der Weyden's style. Delenda writes that, with the exception of Petrus Christus, who was a disciple of Jan van Eyck, traces of Rogier van der Weyden's art can be found in all fifteenth-century artists to varying degrees.

== Gallery ==
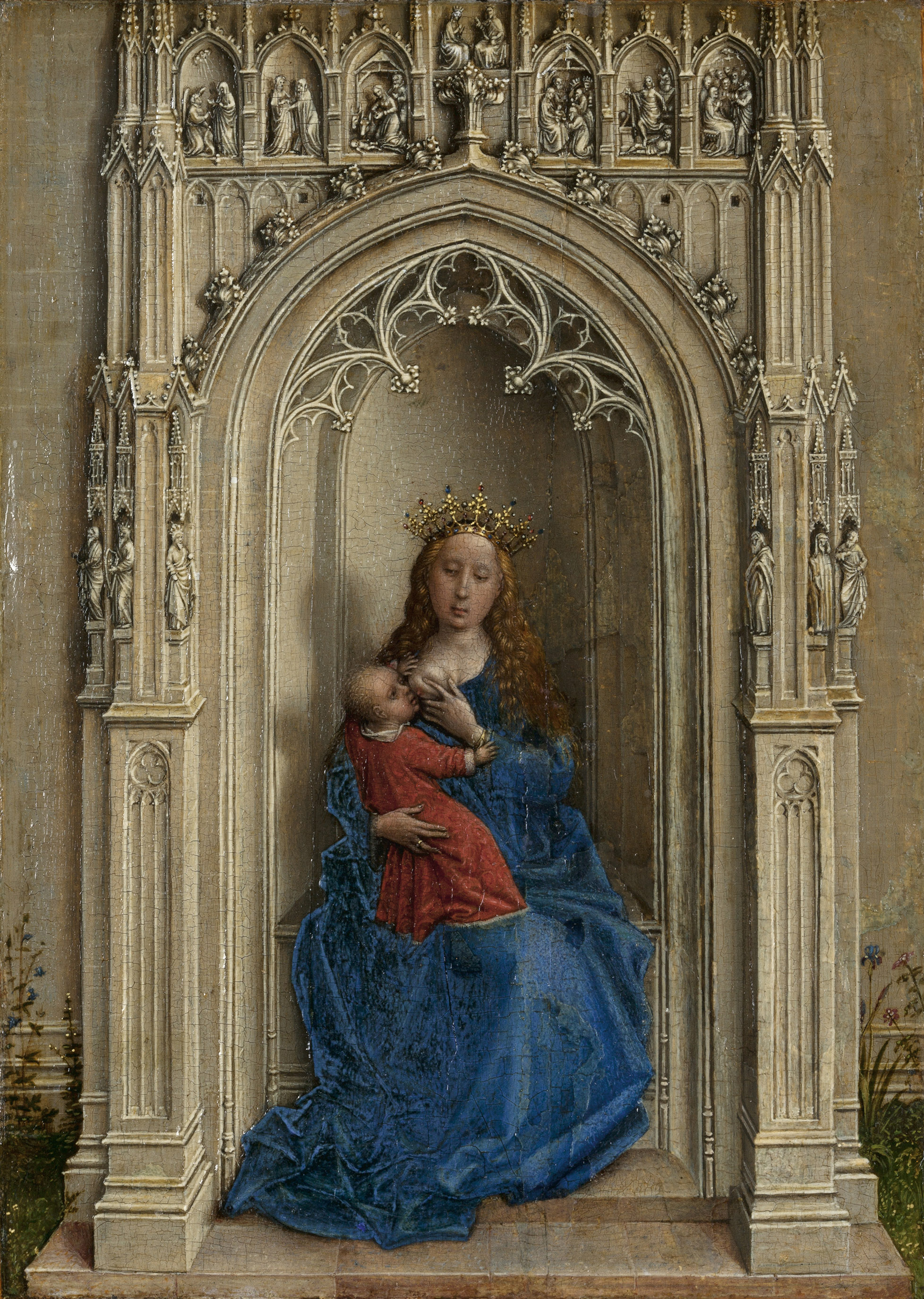
Virgin and Child Enthroned, c. 1433. Museo Thyssen-Bornemisza, Madrid

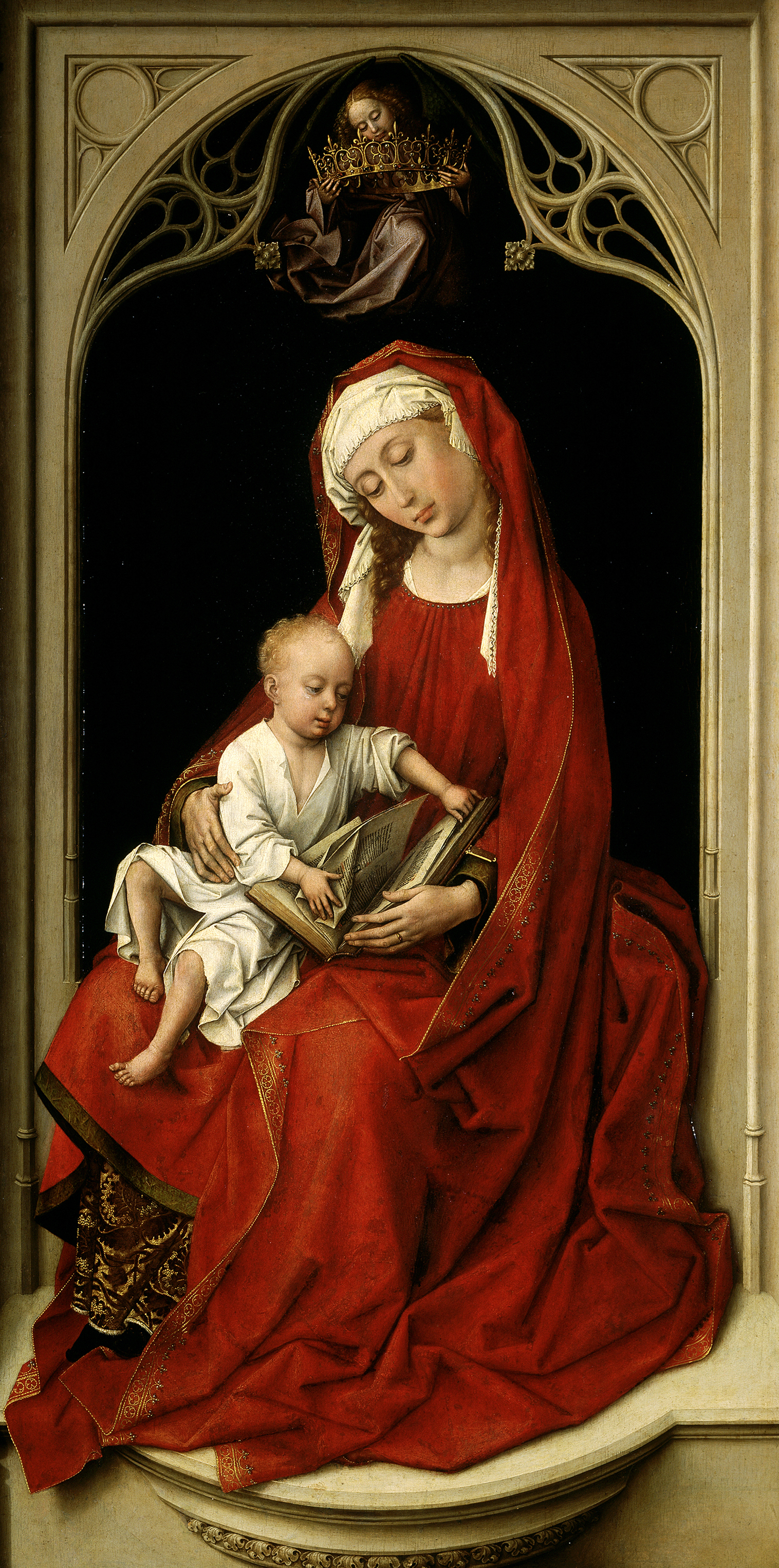
Durán Madonna, 1435–38, Museo del Prado, Madrid

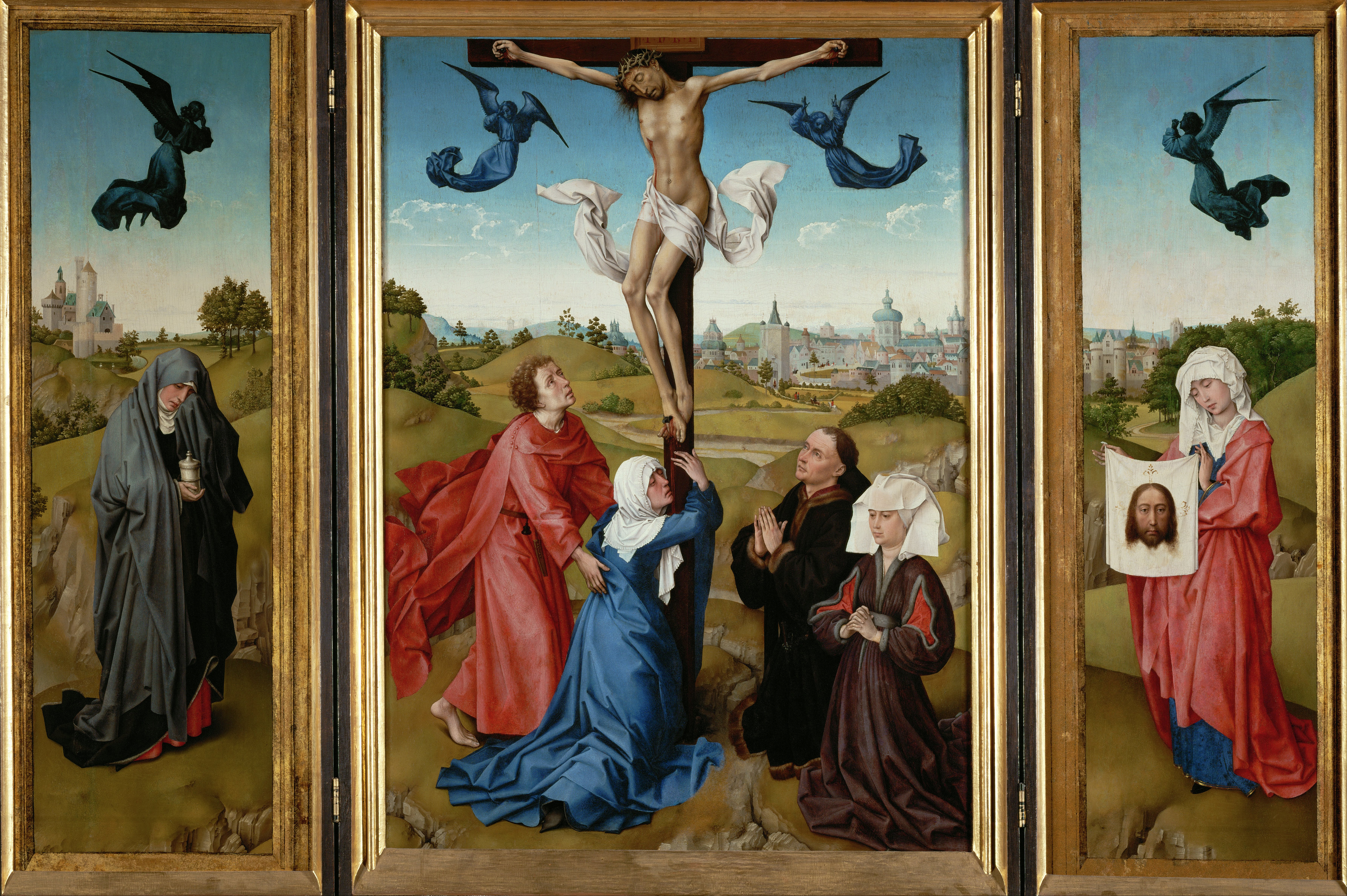
The Crucifixion Triptych, 1440. Kunsthistorisches Museum, Vienna

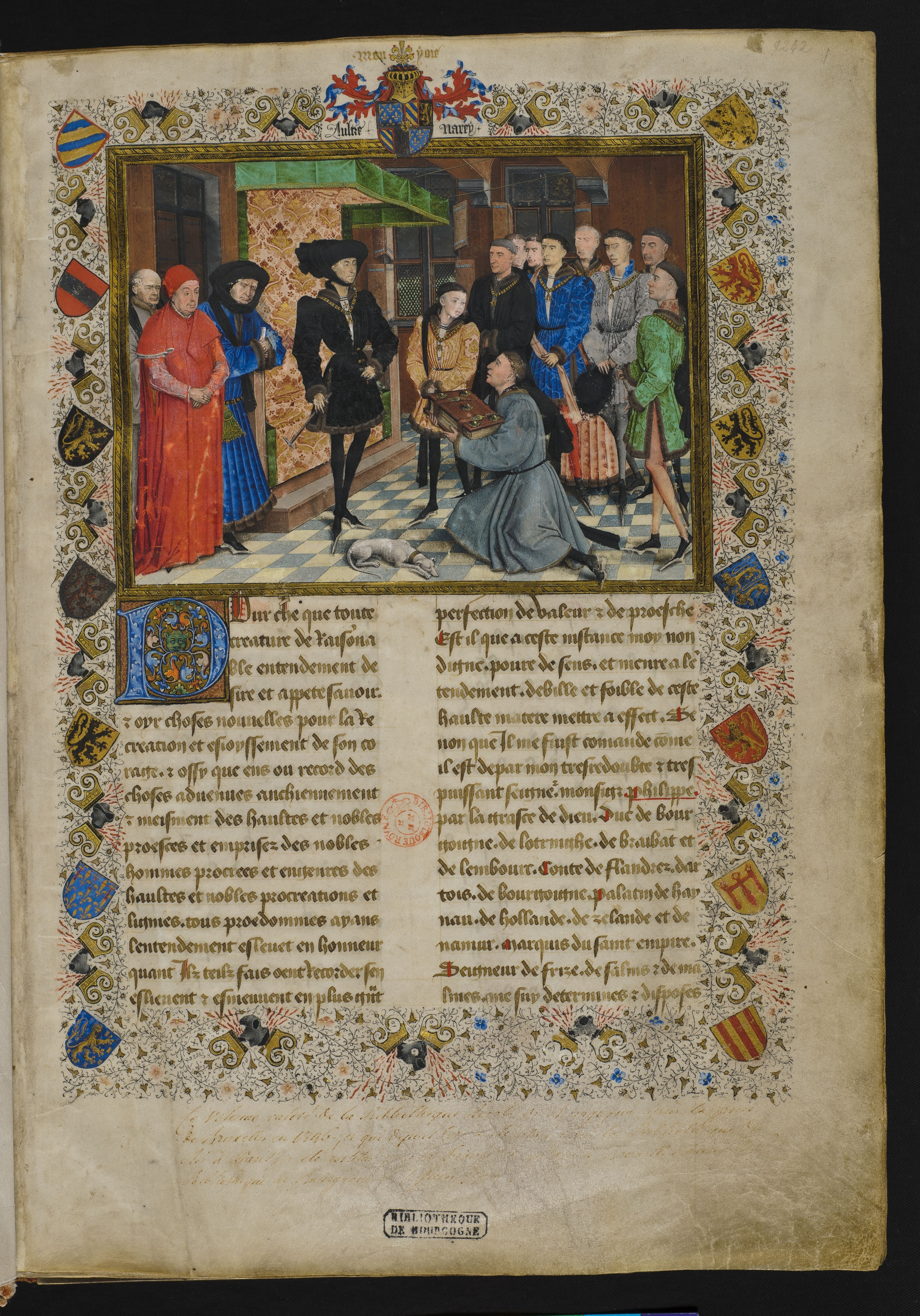
Jean Wauquelin presenting his 'Chroniques de Hainaut' to Philip the Good, c. 1448

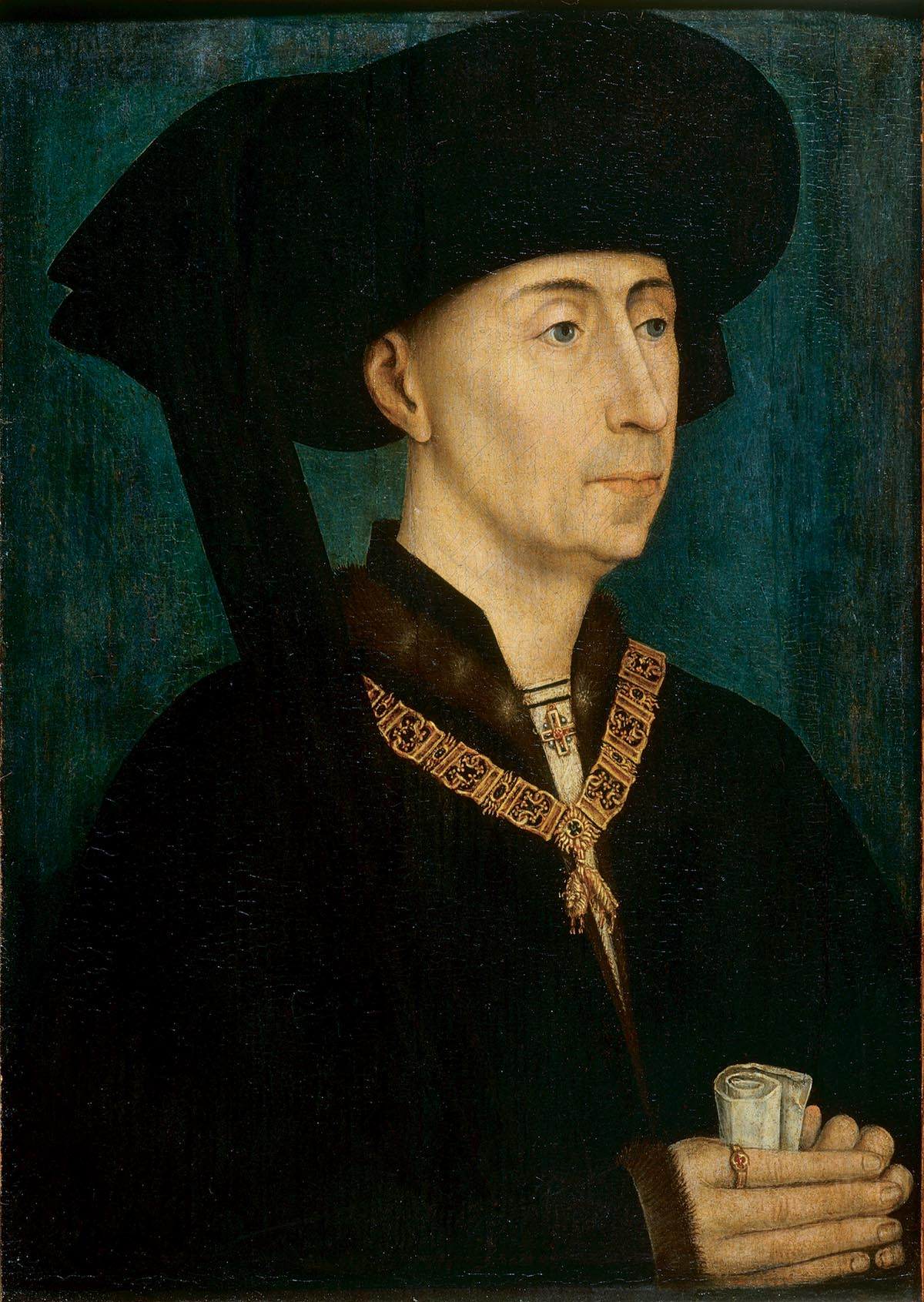
Philip the Good (copy of Van der Weyden of c. 1450)

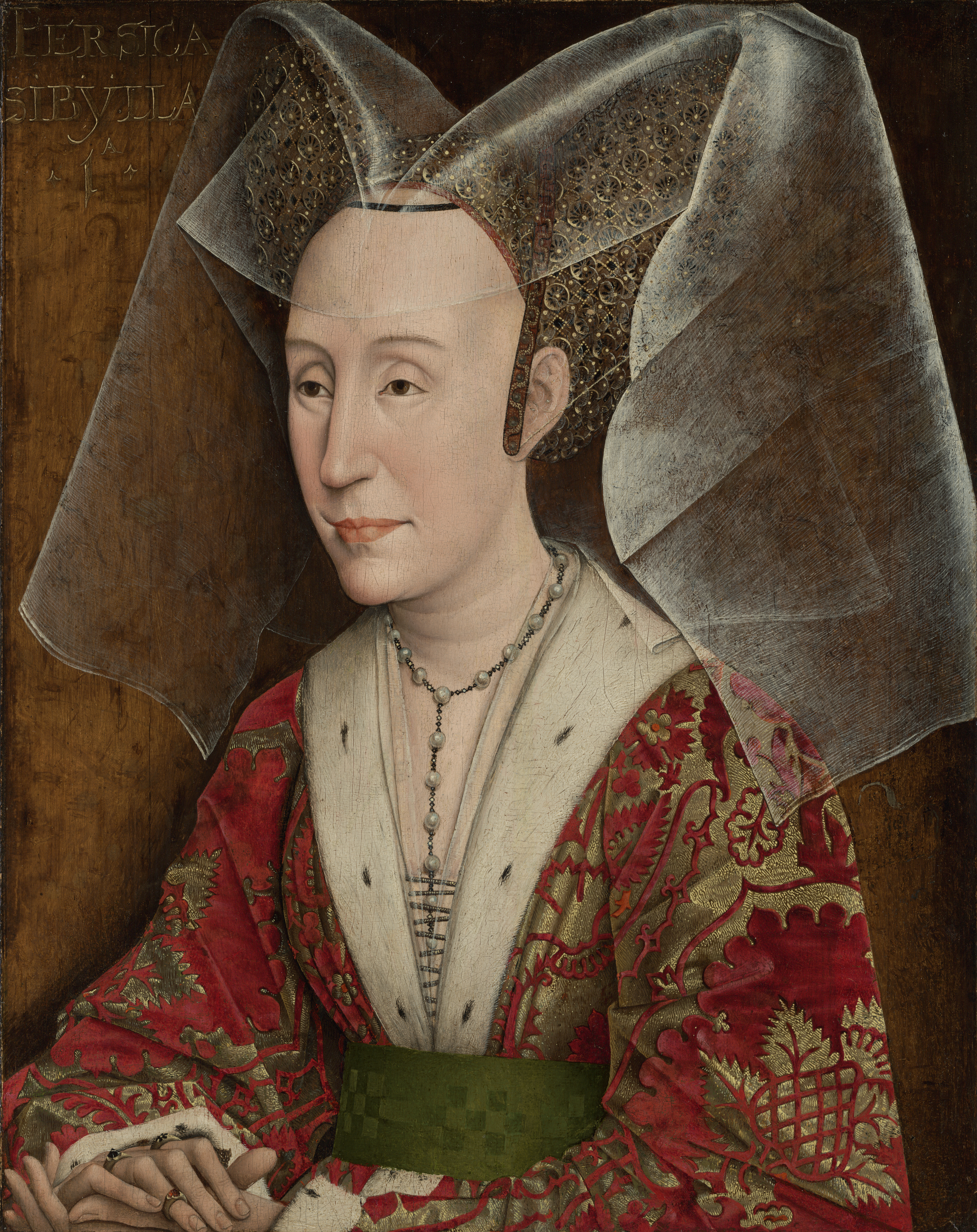
Portrait of Isabella of Portugal, c. 1450

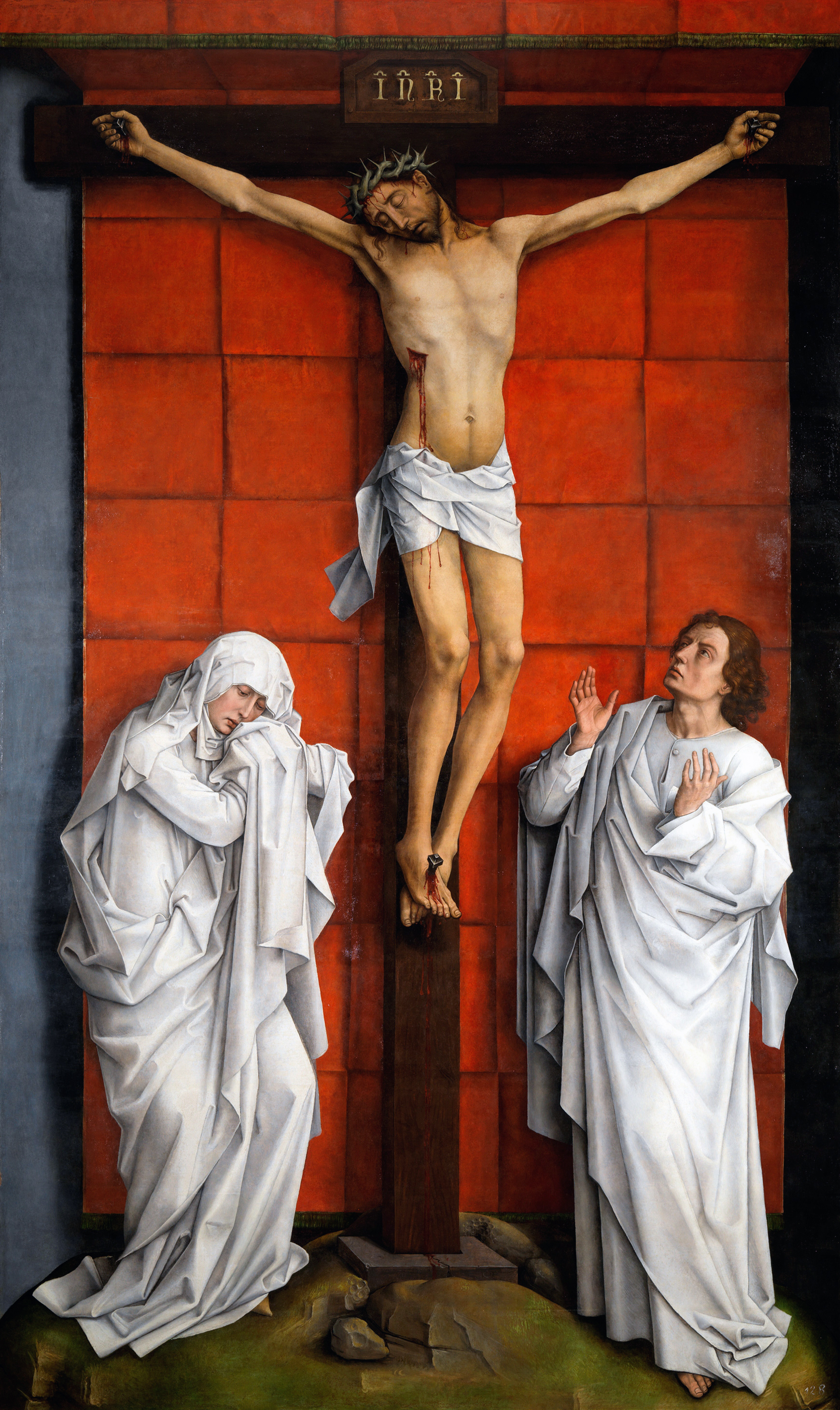
Crucifixion with the Virgin and St. John (1457–1464), oil on oak panel, El Escorial, Madrid

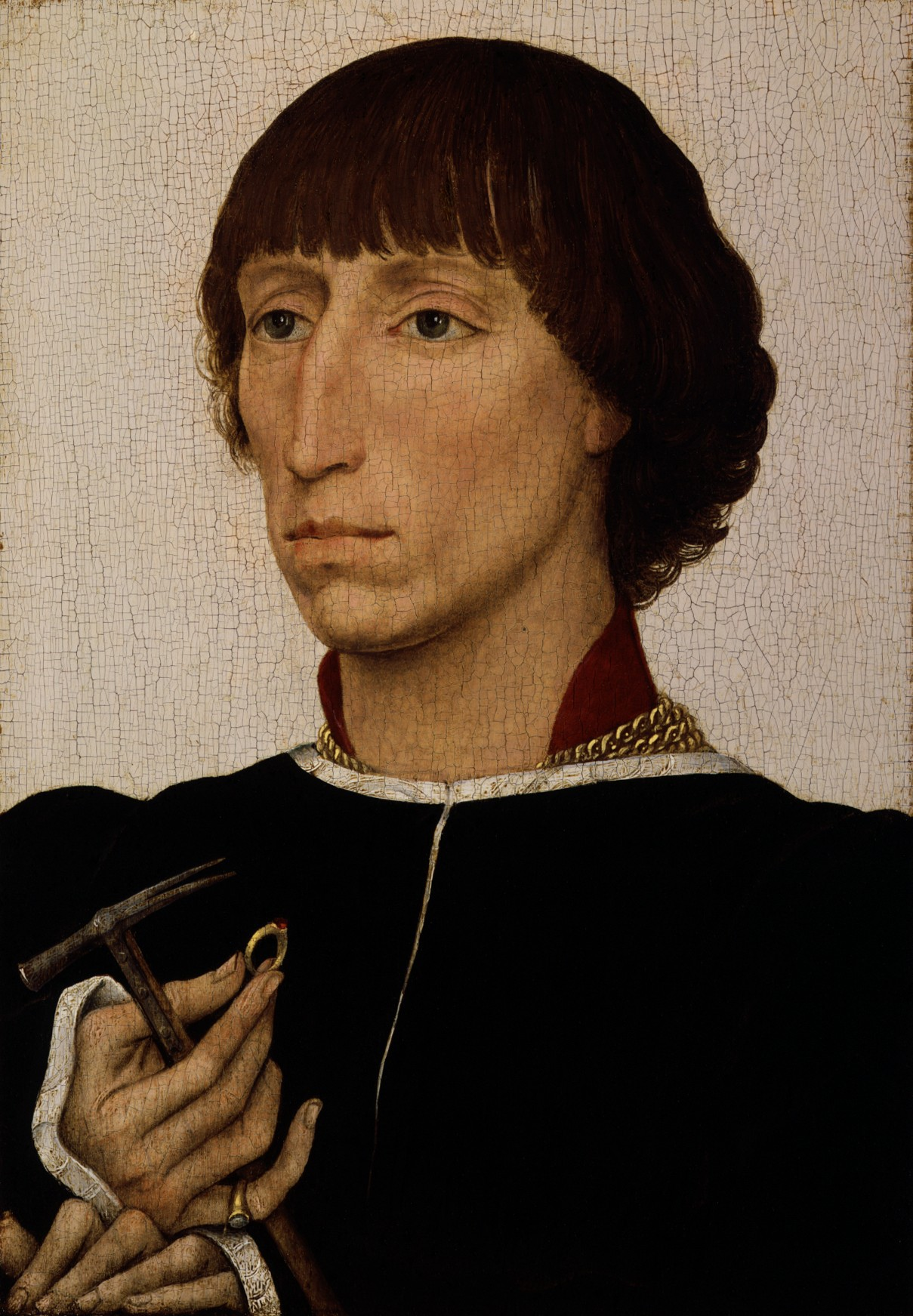
Portrait of Francesco d'Este, c. 1460

== Sources ==
- Campbell, Lorne. Van der Weyden. London: Chaucer Press, 2004. ISBN 1-904449-24-7
- Campbell, Lorne. The Fifteenth Century Netherlandish Schools. London: National Gallery Publications, 1998. ISBN 1-85709-171-X
- Campbell, Lorne & Van der Stock, Jan. Rogier van der Weyden: 1400–1464. Master of Passions. Davidsfonds, Leuven, 2009. ISBN 978-90-8526-105-6
- Châtelet, Albert Van der Weyden. Paris: Gallimard, 1999. ISBN 2-07-011613-1
- Clark, Kenneth. Looking at Pictures. New York: Holt Rinehart and Winston, 1960
- Davies, Martin. Rogier van der Weyden: An Essay with a Critical Catalogue of Paintings Assigned to him and to Robert Campin, London: Phaidon, 1972. ISBN 0-7148-1516-0
- Delenda, Odile. Rogier van der Weyden. Cerf/Tricorne, 1987. ISBN 2-204-02537-2
- De Vos, Dirk. Rogier van der Weyden: The Complete Works. Harry N Abrams, 2000. ISBN 0-8109-6390-6
- De Vos, Dirk. The Flemish Primitives. Amsterdam University Press, 2002.
- Dhanens, Elisabeth. Rogier van der Weyden. Revisie van de documenten. Brussels: Royal Academy of Belgium, 1995.
- Dillenberger, Jane. Style and Content in Christian Art. 2nd Ed. New York: Crossroad Publishing Company, 1986.
- Kemperdick, Stephan. Rogier van der Weyden. Könemann, 2000. ISBN 3-8290-2571-8
- Liess, Reinhard. Zum Logos der Kunst Rogier van der Weydens. Die "Beweinungen Christi" in den Königlichen Museen in Brüssel und in der Nationalgalerie in London, 2 tomes. Munster-Hamburg-London: Lit, 2000. ISBN 3-8258-4158-8.
- Mander, Karel van. Vidas de los pintores flamencos. Madrid: Casimiro, translation by Agustín Temes, 2012; original edition Schilder-Boeck, 1604. ISBN 978-84-15715-02-3
- Marzio, Peter C. A Permanent Legacy: 150 works from the Collection of the Museum of Fine Arts, Houston. New York: Hudson Hills Press, 1989.
- Panofsky, Erwin. Los primitivos flamencos [Early Netherlandish Painting]. Madrid: Cátedra, 2007. ISBN 84-376-1617-4
- Porras, Stephanie. Art of the Northern Renaissance: Courts, Commerce and Devotion. London: Laurence King Publishing, 2018. ISBN 978-1-7862-7165-5
- Silver, Larry. "Early Northern European Paintings". The St. Louis Art Museum Bulletin, Summer 1982. OCLC 716268497
- Snyder, James. Northern Renaissance Art: Painting, Sculpture, The Graphic Arts from 1350 to 1575. 2nd ed. New Jersey: Prentice Hall Inc. and Pearson Education, 2005.
