= María Luisa Caturla =

- c. 1906
- Born: María Luisa Levi Caturla; July 10, 1888; Sant Gervasi de Cassoles, Barcelona, Spain
- Died: August 25, 1984 (aged 96); Villaviciosa de Odón, Madrid, Spain
- Other name: María Luisa Kocherthaler
- Occupations: Art historian, writer, art critic
- Spouse: Kuno Kocherthaler (before 1927)
- Awards: Dame of the Order of Isabella the Catholic; Grand Cross of Alfonso X, the Wise

María Luisa Levi Caturla (1888–1984) was a Spanish art historian, writer, art critic, and art collector. Self-taught, she moved in influential intellectual circles in Madrid and was an expert on Spanish Baroque painter Francisco de Zurbarán. She became a member of the Royal Academy and a royal trustee of the Museo del Prado.

== Early life ==
Caturla was born in Barcelona on 10 July 1888 to a wealthy Jewish family with ties to Germany and Spain, but lived most of her life in Madrid. Although she never attended a university, she developed an early interest in art, especially ceramics and textiles. She began to study art history by reading the books of Heinrich Wölfflin during her first trip to Italy which became a formative experience for her eventual field of work.

== Career ==
Her passion for intellectual engagement led to her becoming part of various renowned European intellectual groups that would influence her later career in art history. Her friendship with the philosopher José Ortega y Gasset especially pushed her to pursue her career in art history. Other close friends in her circle like historian José María de Cossío and Spanish artist Ignacio Zuloaga enriched her intellectual passions and curiosities.

She joined the national commission formed to organize commemorations for the 1928 Centenario de Goya, and began teaching art history to undergraduate college students between 1928 and 1930. After spending time studying in Switzerland, she returned to Spain in 1944 and published one of her most notable early works, Arte de épocas inciertas, comparing modern art to the gothic flamboyant art style. She continued publishing works during and immediately after World War II, including a spate of art primer booklets on various art subjects, such as Zurbaran and El Greco. Gasset, whose Revista de Occidente magazine had been forced to suspend publishing during the Spanish Civil War, used his facilities to publish her work. Caturla published primers on non-controversial subjects to avoid attracting attention from the Francoist government.

She began to conduct extensive research on Zurbaran during the 1940s, publishing works like Zurbaran at the 'Hall of Realms' at Buen Retiro and Bodas y Obras Juveniles de Zurbarán. Her investigation on Zuburan continued in the 1950s with works such as Zurbarán: Estudio y Catalogo de la Exposicion Celebrada de Granada en Junio de 1953. She continued to write about the artist and, at her death in 1984, left a still-unfinished manuscript which would be published a decade later when French historian Odile Delenda translated it into French. An appendix includes ten of the more-than-thirty articles about the artist that Caturla published during her lifetime.

== Recognition ==
In 1954, she was invited by the art institute at Columbia University to speak about the life of Zurbaran and her research on the artist. In 1960, she was appointed to the Royal Board of Trustees of the Museo Nacional del Prado. She was honored for her work in the field of art history by being made a Dame of the Order of Isabella the Catholic and she was awarded the Grand Cross of Alfonso X, the Wise, declaring her work distinguished and in benefit of society in 1975. In 1979, she was admitted to the Royal Academy of Fine Arts of San Fernando and was later made an honorary academic by the academy, after her nomination by Luis Moya, Álvaro Delgado, and the Count of Yebes. In 1982 she was made an honorary academic of the Real Academia Extremeña de las Letras y las Artes of Trujillo.

== Personal life ==
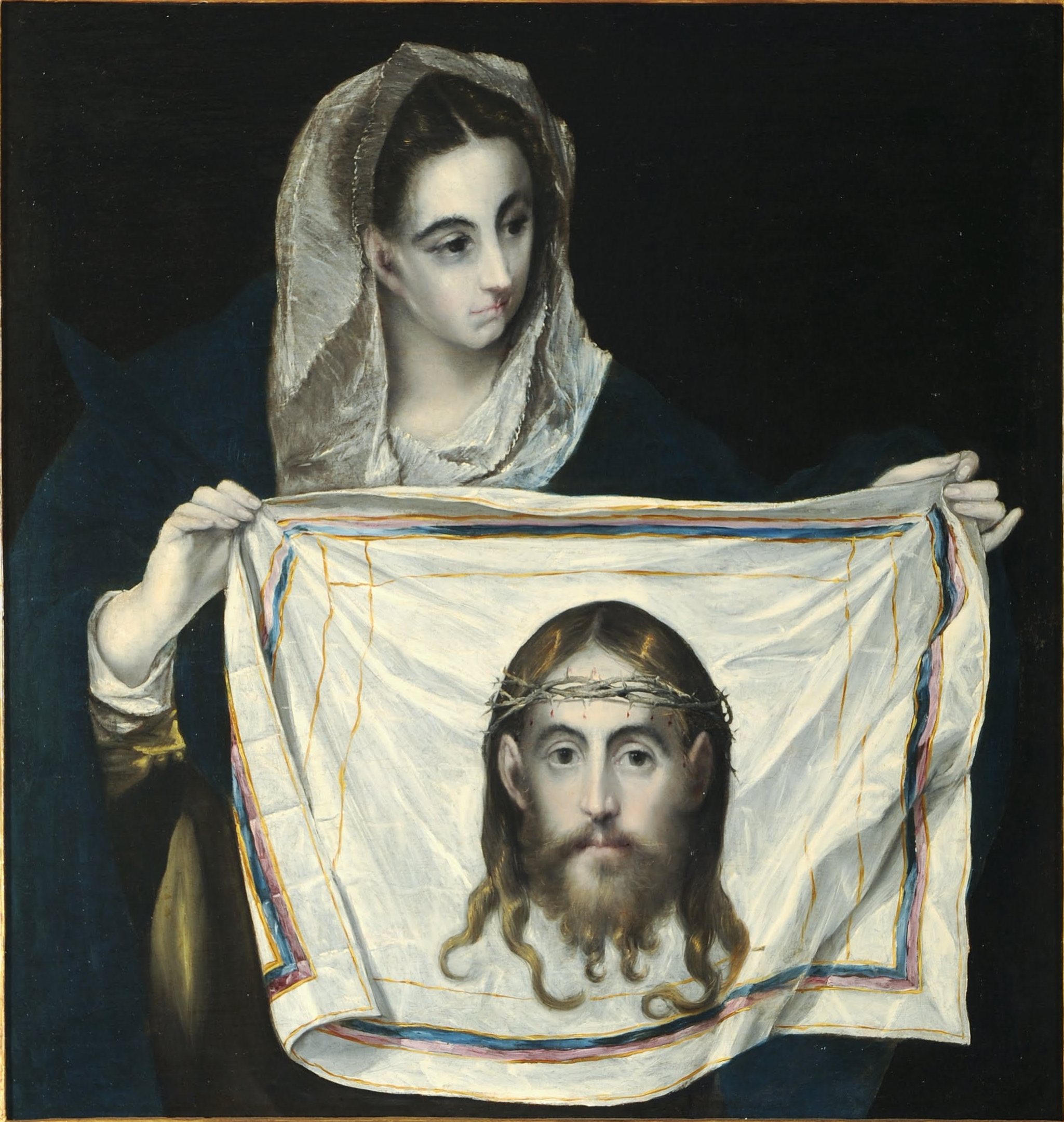
Caturla's El Greco

At a young age, she married Kuno Kocherthaler (their fathers were business partners), and the couple would have five children. She and her husband were art collectors, and built a luxurious home on Madrid's Paseo de la Castellana in which to display their collection, which, in 1922 expanded to include El Greco's La Verónica de la Iglesia de Santo Domingo el Antiguo. In 1927 the couple divorced (in Germany).

== Selected works ==
- "Arte de Épocas Inciertas". Madrid: Revista de Occidente, 1944
- "La Veronica: Vida de un Tema y su transfiguración por El Greco". Madrid: Revista de Occidente, 1944
- "Los Retratos del Salón Dorado en el Antiguo Alcázar de Madrid". Madrid: Archivo Español de Arte, 1947
- "Pinturas, Frondas y Fiestas del Buen Retiro". Madrid: Revista de Occidente, 1947
- "Zurbaran at the 'Hall of Realms' at Buen Retiro". Burlington Magazine for Connoisseurs, 1947
- Bodas y Obras Juveniles de Zurbarán. Granada: Universidad de Granada, 1948
- and J. Sánchez Cantón F. Un Pintor Gallego en la Corte de Felipe IV, Antonio Puga. Consejo Superior de Investigaciones Científicas, Instituto Padre Sarmiento de Estudios Gallegos: Santiago de Compostela, 1952;
- Zurbarán: Estudio y Catalogo de la Exposicion Celebrada De Granada en Junio de 1953. Madrid, 1953
- "Cartas de Pago de los Cuadros de Batallas del Salón de Reinos". 33. Vol. 33. Madrid: Archivo Español de Arte, 1960
- Zurbarán: El Conjunto de las Cuevas. Granada: Albaicín, 1968
- Antonio de Puga: Pintor Gallego. La Coruña: Atlántico, 1982
- Trans. Odile Delenda. Francisco de Zurbarán Caturla. Paris: Wildenstein etc., 1994
