= Trujillo =

Trujillo or Truxillo may refer to:

== Places ==
=== Colombia ===
- Trujillo, Valle del Cauca, a municipality in the department of Valle del Cauca
- Trujillo Province (Gran Colombia), part of the historic republic from 1819 to 1831

=== Dominican Republic ===
- Ciudad Trujillo, the former name of the city of Santo Domingo

=== Honduras ===
- Trujillo, Honduras, a municipality in the department of Colón

=== Peru ===
- Trujillo, Peru, a city in the province of Trujillo
- Trujillo metropolitan area (Peru), a metropolitan area of Trujillo city
- Historic Centre of Trujillo
- Trujillo District, a district in the province of Trujillo
- Trujillo Province, Peru, a province in the region of La Libertad

=== Spain ===
- Trujillo, Spain, a municipality in the autonomous community of Extremadura
- Robledillo de Trujillo

=== United States ===
- Trujillo, Colorado, a place in Archuleta County, Colorado
- Trujillo Meadows Reservoir in Archuleta County, Colorado
- Trujillo Alto, Puerto Rico, a municipality
- Trujillo Alto barrio-pueblo, a downtown and municipality seat of Trujillo Alto, Puerto Rico
- Trujillo Bajo, Carolina, Puerto Rico, a barrio
- Trujillo, Texas, an unincorporated community in Oldham County, Texas
- Truxillo, Virginia, an unincorporated community in Amelia County, Virginia

=== Venezuela ===
- Trujillo (state), one of the 23 states which make up the country
- Trujillo, Trujillo, a municipality in the state of Trujillo
- Trujillo Province (Venezuela), in existence from 1831 to 1864
- Trujillo Canton, a canton in former Trujillo Province

== Other uses ==
- Trujillo (surname)
  - Rafael Trujillo, dictator of the Dominican Republic from 1930 to 1961
- CF Trujillo, a Spanish football team based in Trujillo, Cáceres
- Sport Coopsol Trujillo, a football club based in the city of Trujillo, Peru
- Trujillo (beer), Peruvian brand
- Trujillo Airport (IATA: TJI), serving Trujillo, Colón, Honduras
- Trujillo International Airport, serving Trujillo, Peru
- Trujillo River, a river in Mexico
- SS Trujillo, the last lake tanker to operate in Lake Maracaibo, retired in 1954

== See also ==
- Diocese of Trujillo (disambiguation), multiple dioceses
