= Álvaro Delgado =

Álvaro Delgado may refer to:

- Álvaro Delgado (journalist) (born 1966), Mexican investigative journalist and author
- Álvaro Delgado (politician) (born 1969), Uruguayan politician and veterinarian
- Álvaro Delgado (footballer) (born 1995), Chilean footballer
