= Odile Delenda =

- Education: École du Louvre
- Occupations: Art historian; curator; author
- Employer: Musée du Louvre
- Known for: Scholarship on Velázquez and Zurbarán
- Notable work: Francisco de Zurbarán 1598–1664, Catálogo razonado y crítico (2009–2010)

Odile Delenda is a French art historian, curator, and author. She is a expert on Spanish Baroque painting.

Delenda graduated from École du Louvre and was deputy head of the department of paintings at the Musée du Louvre until 2007.

In 1993 Delenda published Velazquez: Peintre religieux, a monograph about religious iconography in the works of Diego Velázquez. The next year, she edited and translated María Luisa Caturla's monograph about Francisco de Zurbarán which had been left unfinished when Caturla died in 1984.

In 1999 she published another text about the artist, Sur la terre comme au ciel, Zurbarân. In 2009, Delenda assembled and published an authoritative catalogue raisonné of Zurbarán in two volumes. The first volume focuses on works believed to be painted primarily by Zurbarán himself, while the second volume catalogues paintings produced by his workshop, mostly for religious orders.

In 2015 Delenda and Mar Borobia curated an exhibit entitled Zurbarán: A New Perspective which premiered at the Museo Thyssen-Bornemisza in Madrid, and then moved to the Kunstpalast in Dusseldorf. It featured paintings which had never been exhibited previously, or which had been recently rediscovered, and also included works by some of his students. The Burlington Magazine criticized the exhibition for offering a conventional interpretation of Zurbarán's ouvre and failing to deliver the "new perspective" promised in the name.

== Selected works ==
- — (1993). Velazquez: Peintre religieux. preface by Jeannine Baticle. Paris: Editions du Cerf/Tricorne. ISBN 978-28-293011-5-5.
- — (1994). "translation, adaptation and critical apparatus". Francisco de Zurbaran. By Caturla, María Luisa. Paris: Wildenstein Institute. ISBN 2-908063-10-7.
- — (1999). Sur la terre comme au ciel, Zurbarân. Paris: Marne.
- — (2009). Francisco de Zurbarán 1598–1664, Catálogo razonado y critica. Vol. 1. Madrid: Fundación Arte Hispánico. ISBN 978-84-937260-2-7.
- — (2010). Francisco de Zurbarán 1598–1664, Catálogo razonado y critica. Vol. 2. Madrid: Fundación Arte Hispánico. ISBN 978-84-937260-3-4.
