= Alfred Michiels =

French historian and writer

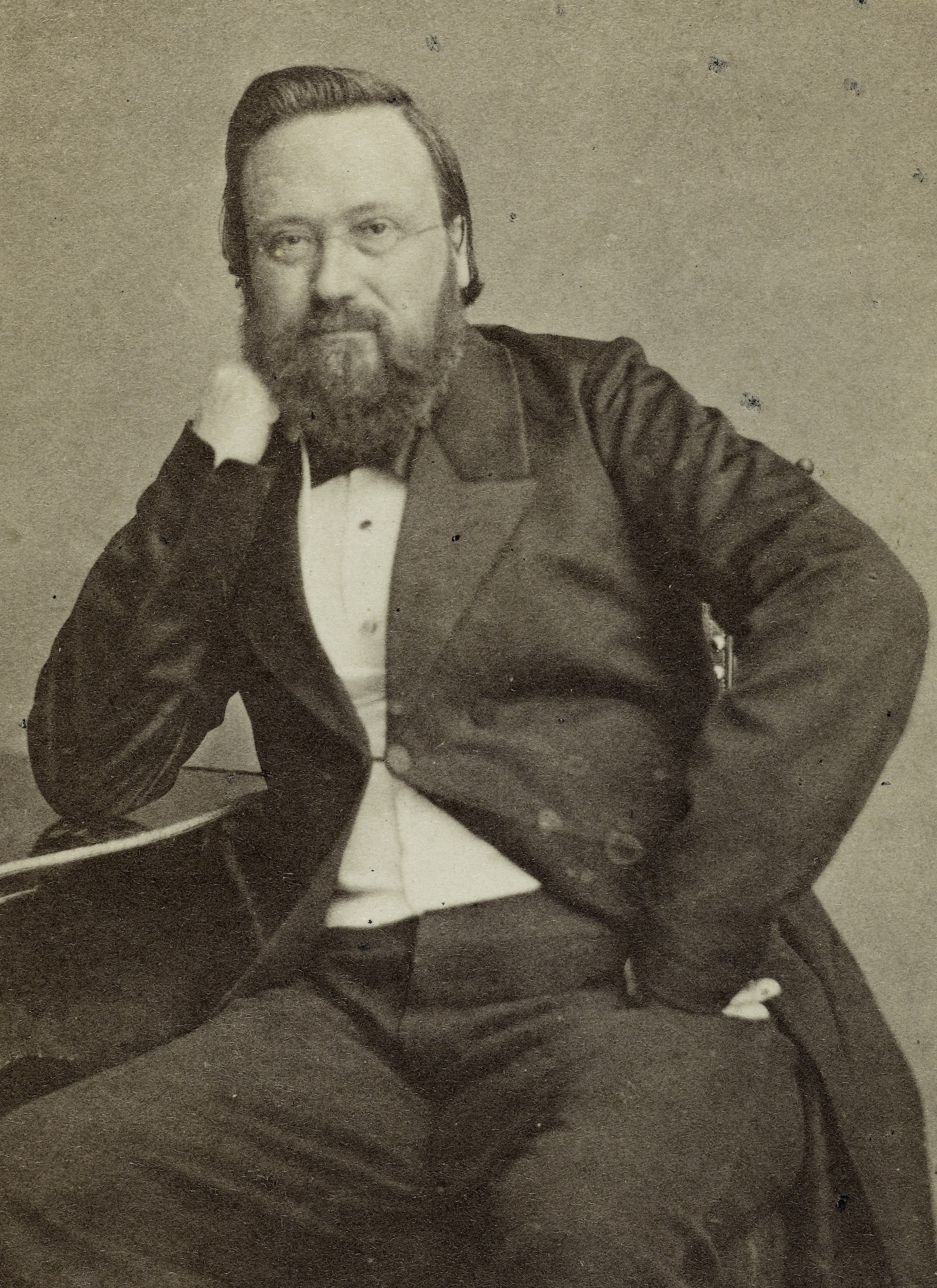
Alfred Michiels

Joseph Alfred Xavier Michiels (December 25, 1813 - October 28, 1892) was a French historian and writer on art and literature.

== Biography ==
He was born in Rome of Dutch-Burgundian parents. He began his law studies at Strassburg (1834), but made his home in Paris.

== Works ==
- Études sur l'Allemagne (Studies of Germany, 1830)
- Histoire des idées littéraires en France au XIXe siècle et de leur origines dans les siècles antérieurs (History of 19th-century literary ideas in France and their origins in previous centuries, 1842)
- Angleterre (England, 1844), of which a fourth edition (1872) was called Voyage d'un amateur: Histoire de la peinture flamande et hollandaise (1845, new ed., enl., 1865–76), and its sequel, L'art flamand dans l'est et le midi de la France (1877)
- L'architecture et la peinture en Europe depuis le IVe au XVIe siècle (Architecture and painting in Europe from the 4th to the 16th centuries, 3d ed. 1873)
- Rubens et l'école d'Anvers (Rubens and the school of Anvers, 4th ed. 1877)
- Histoire secrète du gouvernement autrichien (Secret history of the Austrian government, 4th ed. 1879)
- Le comte de Bismarck (Count Bismarck, 1871)
- Histoire de la guerre franco-prussienne (History of the Franco Prussian War, 1872)
- Van Dyck et ses éleves (Van Dyck and his students, 1880)
- Le monde du comique et du rire (The world of humor and laughing, 1887)
