= Diocese of Trujillo =

The Diocese of Trujillo may refer to:

- Roman Catholic Archdiocese of Trujillo, Peru
- Roman Catholic Diocese of Trujillo (Honduras)
- Roman Catholic Diocese of Trujillo, Venezuela
